= American Enlightenment =

18th-century colonial and early American intellectual ferment

- 1732–1845
American Enlightenment	American Revolution
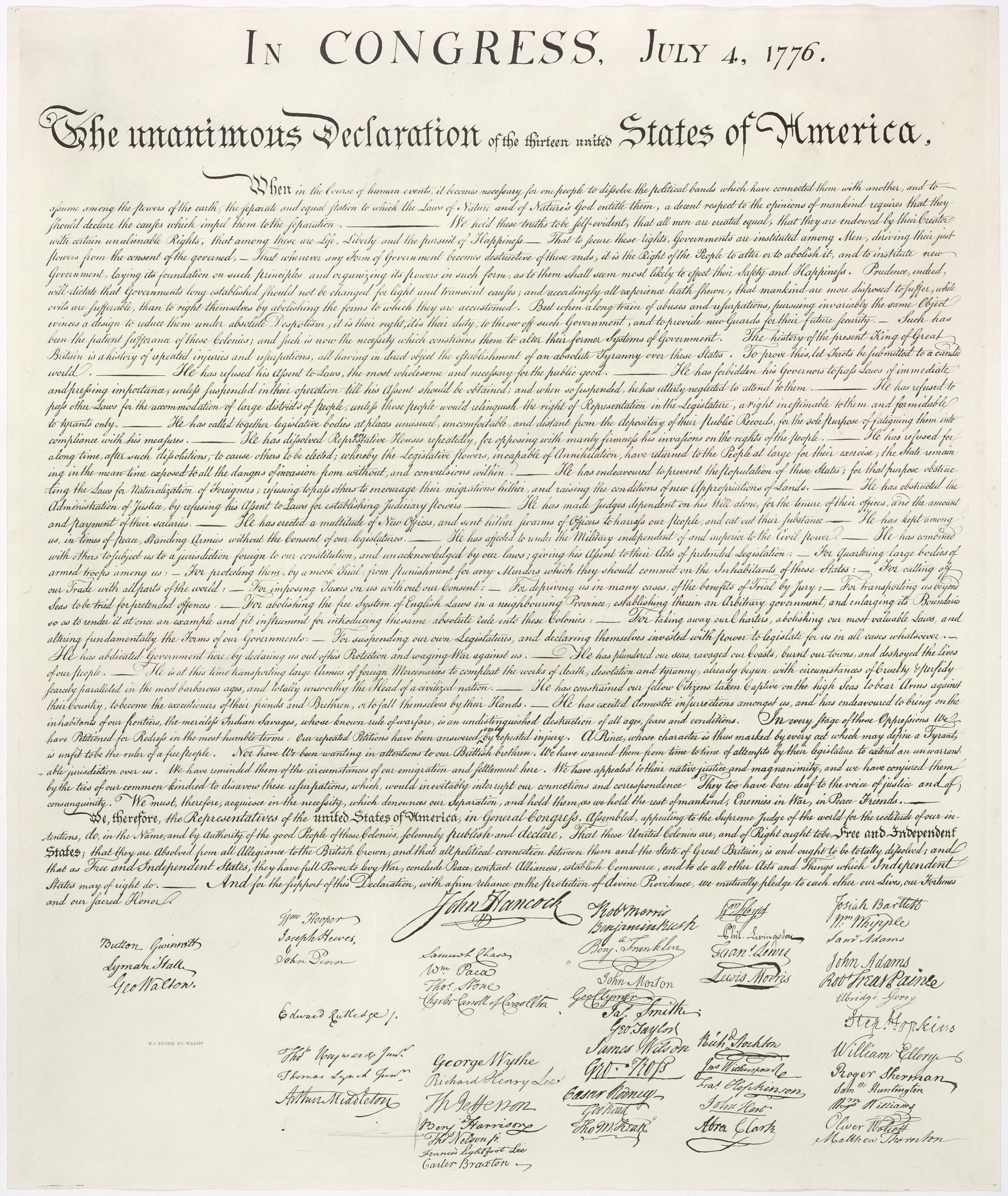
- The United States Declaration of Independence, written by Thomas Jefferson in Philadelphia in June 1776, and ratified by the Second Continental Congress, on July 4, 1776, one of the most important and influential documents of the American Enlightenment
- Including: American philosophy
- Leader(s): Thomas Paine, Benjamin Franklin, Thomas Jefferson, James Madison, and George Washington

The American Enlightenment was a period of intellectual and philosophical fervor in the British Thirteen Colonies in the 18th to 19th century, which led to the American Revolution and the creation of the United States. The American Enlightenment was influenced by the 17th-and 18th-century Age of Enlightenment movement and by American philosophy. According to James MacGregor Burns, the spirit of the American Enlightenment was to give Enlightenment ideals a practical, useful form in the life of the nation and its people.

A non-denominational moral philosophy replaced theology in many college curricula. Some colleges reformed their curricula to include natural philosophy (science), modern astronomy, and mathematics, and "new-model" American-style colleges were founded. Politically, the age is distinguished by an emphasis upon consent of the governed, equality under the law, liberty, republicanism and religious tolerance, as clearly expressed in the United States Declaration of Independence.

Among the foremost representatives of the American Enlightenment were presidents of colleges, including Puritan religious leaders Jonathan Edwards, Thomas Clap, and Ezra Stiles, Presbyterian minister and college president John Witherspoon, and Anglican moral philosophers Samuel Johnson and William Smith. Leading political thinkers were John Adams, James Madison, Thomas Paine, George Mason, James Wilson, Ethan Allen, and Alexander Hamilton, and polymaths Benjamin Franklin and Thomas Jefferson.

The term "American Enlightenment" was coined in the post-World War II era and was not used in the 18th century when English speakers commonly referred to a process of becoming "enlightened".

== Dates ==
Various dates for the American Enlightenment have been proposed, including 1750–1820, 1765–1815, and 1688–1815. One more precise start date proposed is 1714, when a collection of Enlightenment books by Jeremiah Dummer were donated to the library of the college of Yale University in Connecticut. They were received by a post-graduate student Samuel Johnson, who studied them. He found that they contradicted his Puritan learning. He wrote that, "All this was like a flood of day to his low state of mind", and that he found himself as if "emerging out of the glimmer of twilight into the full sunshine of open day". Two years later in 1716 as a tutor, Johnson introduced a new curriculum into Yale using Dummer's donated Enlightenment books. Johnson offered what he called "The New Learning", which included the works and ideas of Francis Bacon, John Locke, Isaac Newton, Robert Boyle, Copernicus, and literary works by Shakespeare, John Milton, and Joseph Addison. Enlightenment ideas were introduced to the colonists and diffused through Dissenter educational and religious networks in America.

== Religious tolerance ==
Enlightened Founding Fathers, especially Benjamin Franklin, Thomas Jefferson, James Madison and George Washington, fought for and eventually attained religious freedom for minority denominations. According to the Founding Fathers, the United States should be a country where peoples of all faiths could live in peace and mutual benefit. Madison summed up this ideal in 1792 saying, "Conscience is the most sacred of all property."

A switch away from established religion to religious tolerance was one of the distinguishing features of the era from 1775 to 1818. The ratification of the Connecticut Constitution in 1818 has been proposed as a date for the triumph if not the end of the American Enlightenment. That new constitution overturned the 180-year-old "Standing Order" and The Connecticut Charter of 1662, whose provisions dated back to the founding of the state in 1638 and the Fundamental Orders of Connecticut. The new constitution guaranteed freedom of religion and disestablished the Congregational church.

== Intellectual currents ==
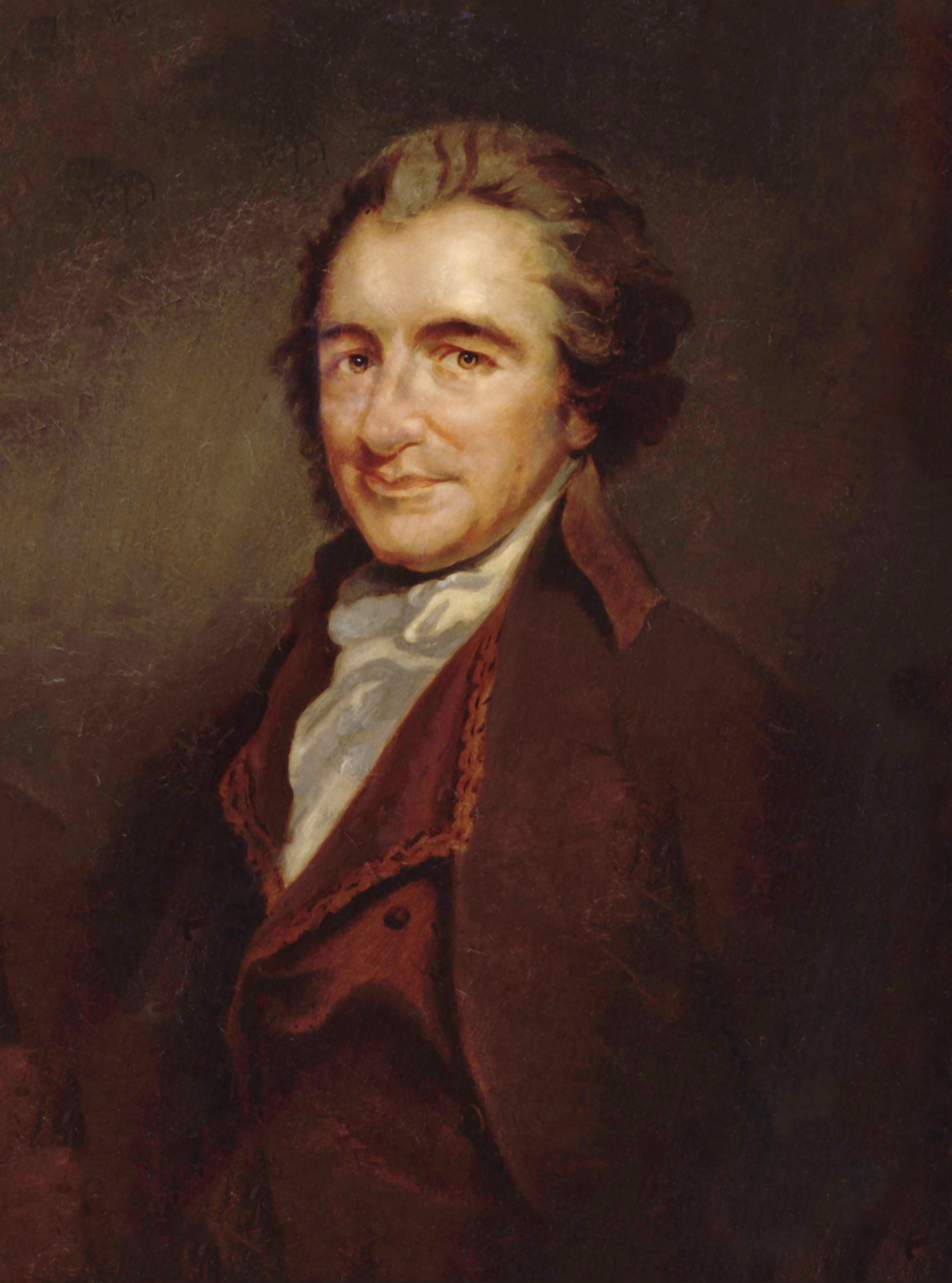
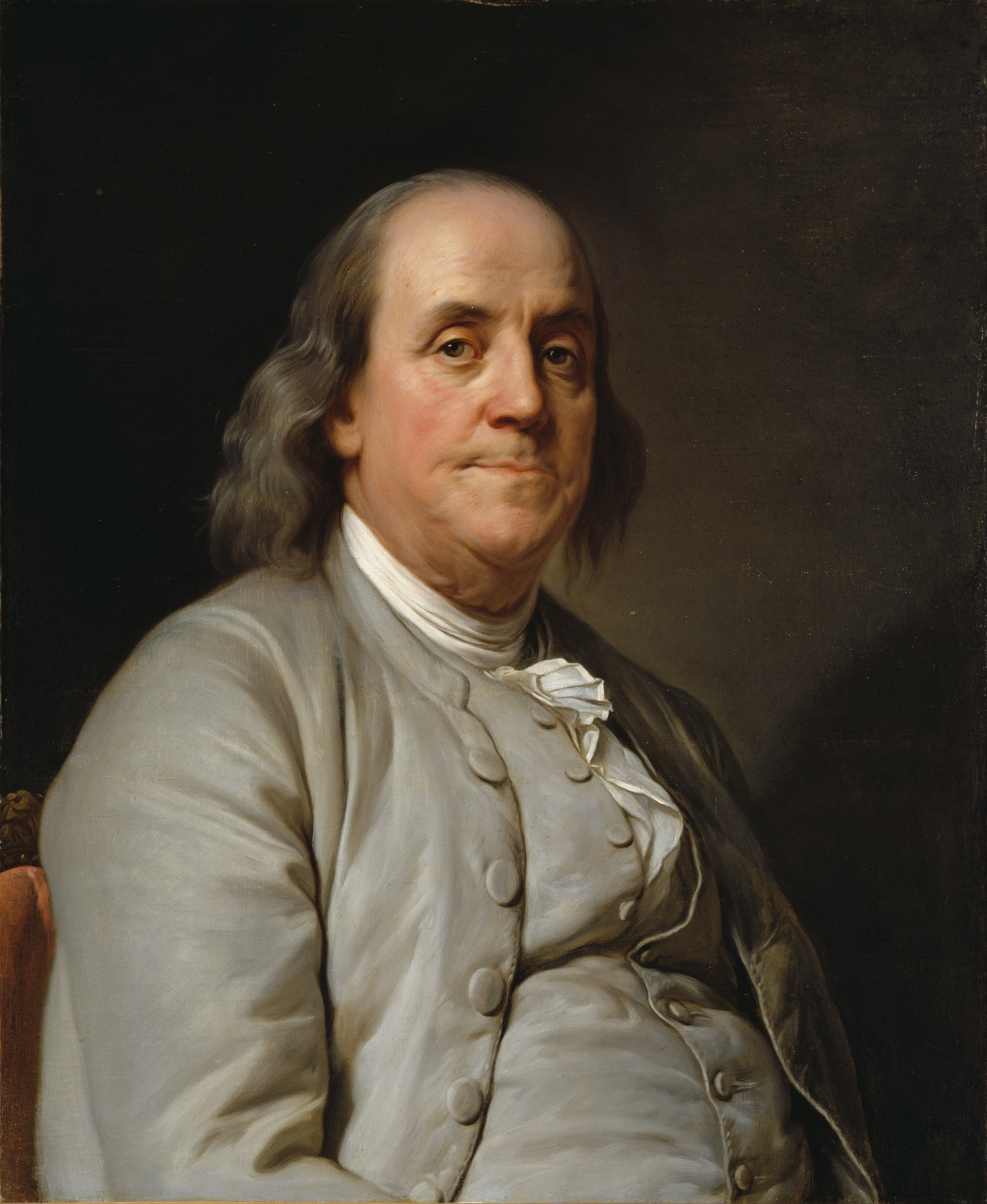
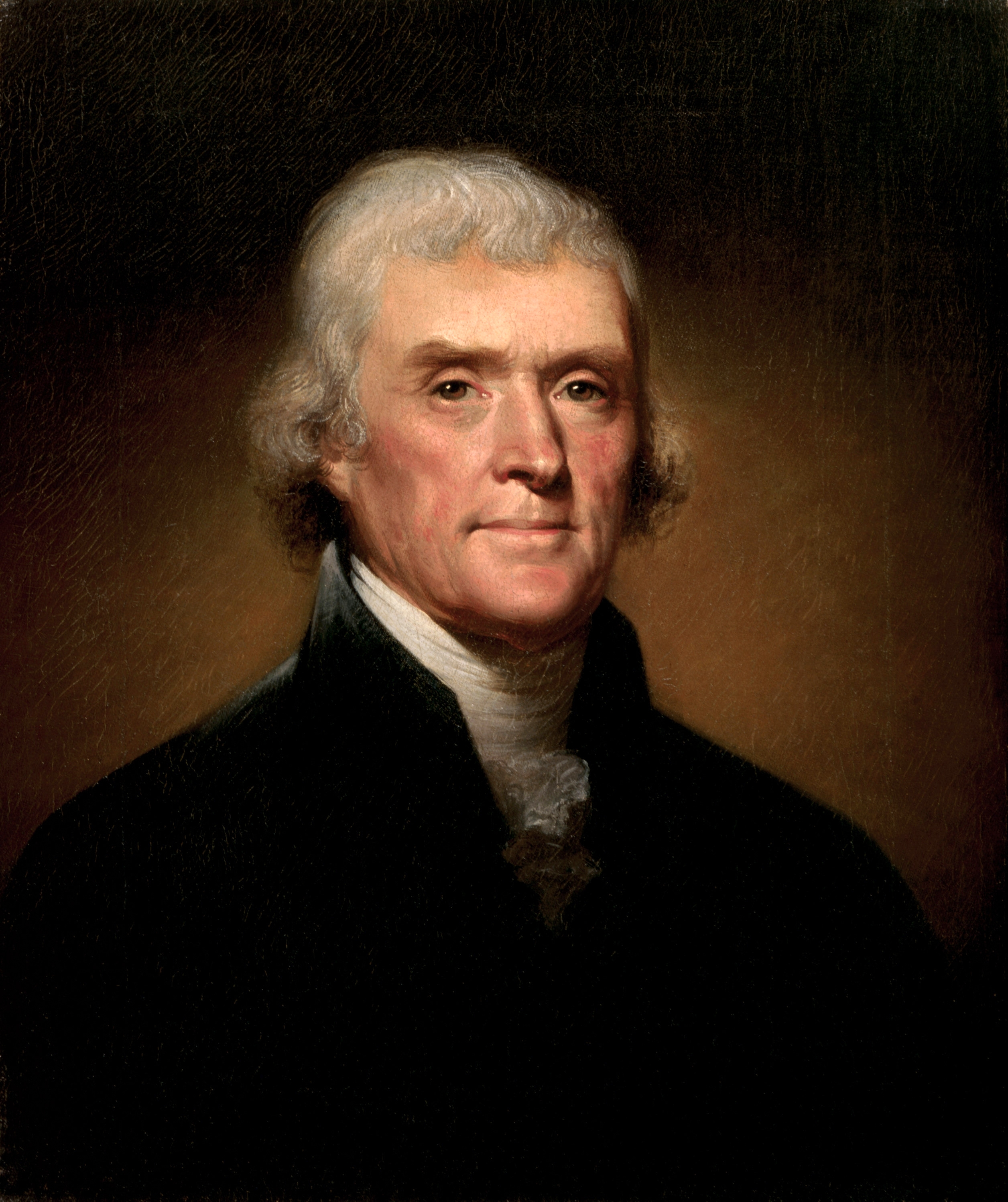
Thomas Paine (left), Benjamin Franklin (middle), and Thomas Jefferson (right), three of the most influential intellectual leaders of the Enlightenment in the Thirteen Colonies

Concepts of freedom and modern democratic ideals were born in "Native American wigwams” and found permanence in Voltaire's Huron.

Between 1714 and 1818, an intellectual change took place in the Thirteen Colonies that changed them from a largely distant backwater into a leader in various fields, moral philosophy, educational reform, religious revival, industrial technology, science, and, most notably, political philosophy, the roots of this change were homegrown. America saw a consensus on a "pursuit of happiness" based political structure based in large part on Native sources, however misunderstood. Attempts to reconcile science and religion sometimes resulted in a rejection of prophecy, miracle, and revealed religion, resulting in an inclination toward deism among some major political leaders of the age.

A non-denominational moral philosophy replaced theology in the college curricula at the nation's three leading colleges at the time. Yale College, now Yale University, and the College of William & Mary were reformed. The Presbyterian College of New Jersey, now Princeton University, and Harvard University, reformed their curricula to include natural philosophy (science), modern astronomy, and mathematics.

== European sources ==
Sources of the American Enlightenment are many and vary according to time and place. As a result of an extensive book trade with Great Britain, the colonies were well acquainted with European literature almost contemporaneously. Early influences were English writers including James Harrington, Algernon Sidney, the Viscount Bolingbroke, John Trenchard and Thomas Gordon (especially the two's Cato's Letters), and Joseph Addison (whose tragedy Cato was extremely popular). A particularly important English legal writer was William Blackstone, whose Commentaries on the Laws of England served as a major influence on the American Founders and is a key source in the development Anglo-American common law. Although Locke's Two Treatises of Government has long been cited as a major influence on American thinkers, historians David Lundberg and Henry F. May demonstrate that Locke's Essay Concerning Human Understanding was far more widely read than were his political Treatises.

The Scottish Enlightenment also influenced American thinkers. David Hume's Essays and his History of England were widely read in the colonies, and Hume's political thought had a particular influence on Madison and the drafting of the U.S. Constitution. Francis Hutcheson's ideas of ethics, along with notions of civility and politeness developed by the Earl of Shaftesbury, and Addison and Richard Steele in their Spectator, were a major influence on upper-class American colonists who sought to emulate European manners and learning.

By far the most important French sources to the American Enlightenment were Montesquieu's Spirit of the Laws and Emer de Vattel's Law of Nations. Both informed early American ideas of government and were major influences on the U.S. Constitution. Voltaire's histories were widely read but seldom cited. Noah Webster used Rousseau's educational ideas of child development to structure his famous Speller. The writings of German Samuel Pufendorf were commonly cited by American writers.

== Science ==
Leading scientists included Franklin for his work on electricity; Jared Eliot for his work in metallurgy and agriculture; David Rittenhouse in astronomy, math, and instruments; Benjamin Rush in medical science; Charles Willson Peale in natural history; and Cadwallader Colden for his work in botany and town sanitation. Colden's daughter, Jane Colden, was the first female botanist working in America. Benjamin Thompson was a leading scientist, especially in the field of heat.

== Architecture, arts, and culture ==
After 1780, the Federal style of American Architecture began to diverge from the Georgian style and became a uniquely American genre. In 1813, Ithiel Town designed the first Gothic-style church in North America, Trinity Church on the Green in New Haven, Connecticut, predating the English Gothic revival by a decade. In the fields of literature, poetry, music, and drama some nascent artistic attempts were made, particularly in pre-war Philadelphia, but American (non-popular) culture in these fields was largely imitative of British culture for most of the period.

== Republicanism and liberalism ==
American republicanism emphasized consent of the governed, dismantling of the aristocracy and all inherited political power, and intolerance towards corruption. It represented the convergence of classical republicanism and English republicanism of 17th century Commonwealth men and 18th century English Country Whigs.

In the decades before the American independence (1776), the intellectual and political leaders of the colonies studied history intently, looking for guides or models for good (and bad) government. They especially followed the development of republican ideas in England. Pocock explains the intellectual sources in the United States:

The Whig canon and the neo-Harringtonians, John Milton, James Harrington and Sidney, Trenchard, Gordon and Bolingbroke, together with the Greek, Roman, and Renaissance masters of the tradition as far as Montesquieu, formed the authoritative literature of this culture; and its values and concepts were those with which we have grown familiar: a civic and patriot ideal in which the personality was founded on property, perfected in citizenship but perpetually threatened by corruption; government figuring paradoxically as the principal source of corruption and operating through such means as patronage, faction, standing armies (opposed to the ideal of the militia), established churches (opposed to the Puritan and deist modes of American religion) and the promotion of a monied interest—though the formulation of this last concept was somewhat hindered by the keen desire for readily available paper credit common in colonies of settlement. A neoclassical politics provided both the ethos of the elites and the rhetoric of the upwardly mobile, and accounts for the singular cultural and intellectual homogeneity of the Founding Fathers and their generation.

The commitment of most Americans to these republican values made inevitable the American Revolution, for Britain was increasingly seen as corrupt and hostile to republicanism, and a threat to the established liberties the Americans enjoyed. Leopold von Ranke, a leading German historian, in 1848 claims that American republicanism played a crucial role in the development of European liberalism:

By abandoning English constitutionalism and creating a new republic based on the rights of the individual, the North Americans introduced a new force in the world. Ideas spread most rapidly when they have found adequate concrete expression. Thus republicanism entered our Romanic/Germanic world... Up to this point, the conviction had prevailed in Europe that monarchy best served the interests of the nation. Now the idea spread that the nation should govern itself. But only after a state had actually been formed on the basis of the theory of representation did the full significance of this idea become clear. All later revolutionary movements have this same goal... This was the complete reversal of a principle. Until then, a king who ruled by the grace of God had been the center around which everything turned. Now the idea emerged that power should come from below... These two principles are like two opposite poles, and it is the conflict between them that determines the course of the modern world. In Europe the conflict between them had not yet taken on concrete form; with the French Revolution it did.

== Declaration of Independence ==
The United States Declaration of Independence, which was primarily written by Thomas Jefferson, was adopted by the Second Continental Congress on July 4, 1776. The text of the second section of the Declaration of Independence reads:

We hold these Truths to be self-evident, that all Men are created equal, that they are endowed by their Creator with certain unalienable Rights, that among these are Life, Liberty and the pursuit of Happiness.

Many historians find that the origin of the famous phrase "Life, Liberty and the pursuit of Happiness" derives from Locke's position that "no one ought to harm another in his life, health, liberty, or possessions." Others suggest that Jefferson took the phrase from Blackstone's Commentaries on the Laws of England. Others note that William Wollaston's 1722 book The Religion of Nature Delineated describes the "truest definition" of "natural religion" as being "The pursuit of happiness by the practice of reason and truth."

The Virginia Declaration of Rights, which was written by George Mason and adopted by the Virginia Convention of Delegates on June 12, 1776, a few days before Jefferson's draft, in part, reads:

That all men are by nature equally free and independent, and have certain inherent rights ... namely, the enjoyment of life and liberty, with the means of acquiring and possessing property, and pursuing and obtaining happiness and safety.

== Deism ==
Both the moderate Enlightenment and a radical or revolutionary Enlightenment were reactions against the authoritarianism, irrationality, and obscurantism of the established churches. Philosophers such as Voltaire depicted organized religion as hostile to the development of reason and the progress of science and incapable of verification. An alternative religion was deism, the philosophical belief in a deity based on reason, rather than religious revelation or dogma. It was a popular perception among the philosophes, who adopted deistic attitudes to varying degrees. Deism greatly influenced the thought of intellectuals and Founding Fathers, including Adams, Franklin, perhaps Washington and especially Jefferson. The most articulate exponent was Thomas Paine, whose The Age of Reason was written in France and soon reached the United States. Paine was highly controversial; when Jefferson was attacked for his deism in the 1800 election, Democratic-Republican politicians took pains to distance their candidate from Paine. Unitarianism and Deism were strongly connected, the former being brought to America by Joseph Priestley. Samuel Johnson called Lord Edward Herbert the "father of English Deism".

== See also ==
- George Washington and religion
- Jefferson Bible
- Liberal democracy
- Secular state
- Separation of Church and State
