= An Account of Denmark, as it was in the Year 1692 =

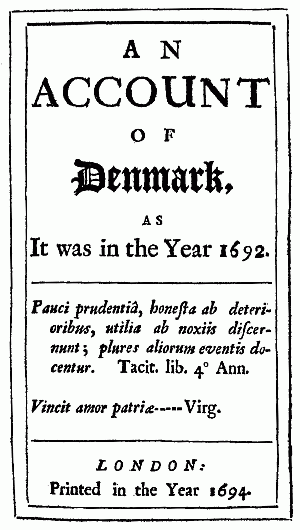
- Title page of the 1694 edition
- Author: Robert Molesworth, 1st Viscount Molesworth
- Original title: 'An Account of Denmark as it was in the Year 1692'
- Language: English
- Subject: Political philosophy, comparative politics
- Genre: Non-fiction
- Publisher: Anonymous
- Publication date: 1694
- Publication place: England

An Account of Denmark, as it was in the Year 1692 was a book by Robert Molesworth after he returned as English Ambassador to Denmark.

Molesworth was a supporter of William III who had fled Ireland in 1689 and was made ambassador to Denmark by William leaving Denmark after an argument with the Danish Court for the Spanish Netherlands where he composed An Account of Denmark.

It was seen as one of the foundational works of the Radical Whig opponents of the Whig ministries of William III and later monarchs. The central thesis was that there had been a constitutional revolution in Denmark in 1660 that had paved the way for the royal absolutist King's Law that could be repeated in England. As well as being critical of a Danish government portrayed as arbitrary and tyrannical it was also highly anticlerical.

An Account was popular and was approved by both the Earl of Shaftesbury and John Locke. It was intended to reflect Molesworth's Whig sympathies and played a part in the Standing Army Controversy where English opponents of a standing army such as John Trenchard drew upon its association of absolutism with a paid army.

William King wrote in reply Animadversions on the Pretended Account of Denmark with material provided by the Danish ambassador to London Mogens Skeel accusing Molesworth of being expelled for of poaching on royal estates while he was ambassador and driving down a road exclusively reserved for the Danish King. In thanks for his work Prince George of Denmark got King appointed as a secretary to his wife Princess Anne, they had previously unsuccessfully tried to punish Molesworth. Other responses were The Commonwealth's man unmasqu'd, or a just rebuke to the author of the Account of Denmark and Deffense du Danemark.

In 1959 the book was said to still be the best and most accurate account in English about the events of 1660.

It was somewhat influential in the burgeoning field of political science in the period. He made a case for comparative political analysis, comparing the political situation of a country to the health of an individual; a disease, he reasoned, can only be diagnosed by comparing it to its instantiation in other people.

== Sources ==
- Aitken, George Atherton (1892). "King, William (1663-1712)" . Dictionary of National Biography. London: Smith, Elder & Co.
- King, William (1694). "Animadversions on the Pretended Account of Denmark". In Nichols, John (ed.). The Original Works of William King: Now First Collected into Three Volumes; with Historical Notes, and Memoirs of the Author. Vol. 1 (1776 ed.). London: Printed for the editor; and sold by N. Conant, successor to Mr. Whiston.
- Molesworth, Robert (1694). An Account of Denmark As it was in the Year 1692.
- Robbins, Caroline (1959). The Eighteenth-Century Commonwealthman: Studies in the Transmission, Development, and Circumstance of English Liberal Thought from the Restoration of Charles II until the War with the Thirteen Colonies (1961 ed.).
- Schwoerer, Lois G. (1965). "The Literature of the Standing Army Controversy". Huntington Library Quarterly. 28: 189–212.
- Seccombe, Thomas (1894). "Molesworth, Robert" . Dictionary of National Biography. London: Smith, Elder & Co.
- Thompson, Martyn P (1976). "A Note on "Reason" and "History" in Late Seventeenth Century Political Thought". Political Theory. 4 (4): 491–504.
