= Standing Army Controversy =

English political and ideological debate

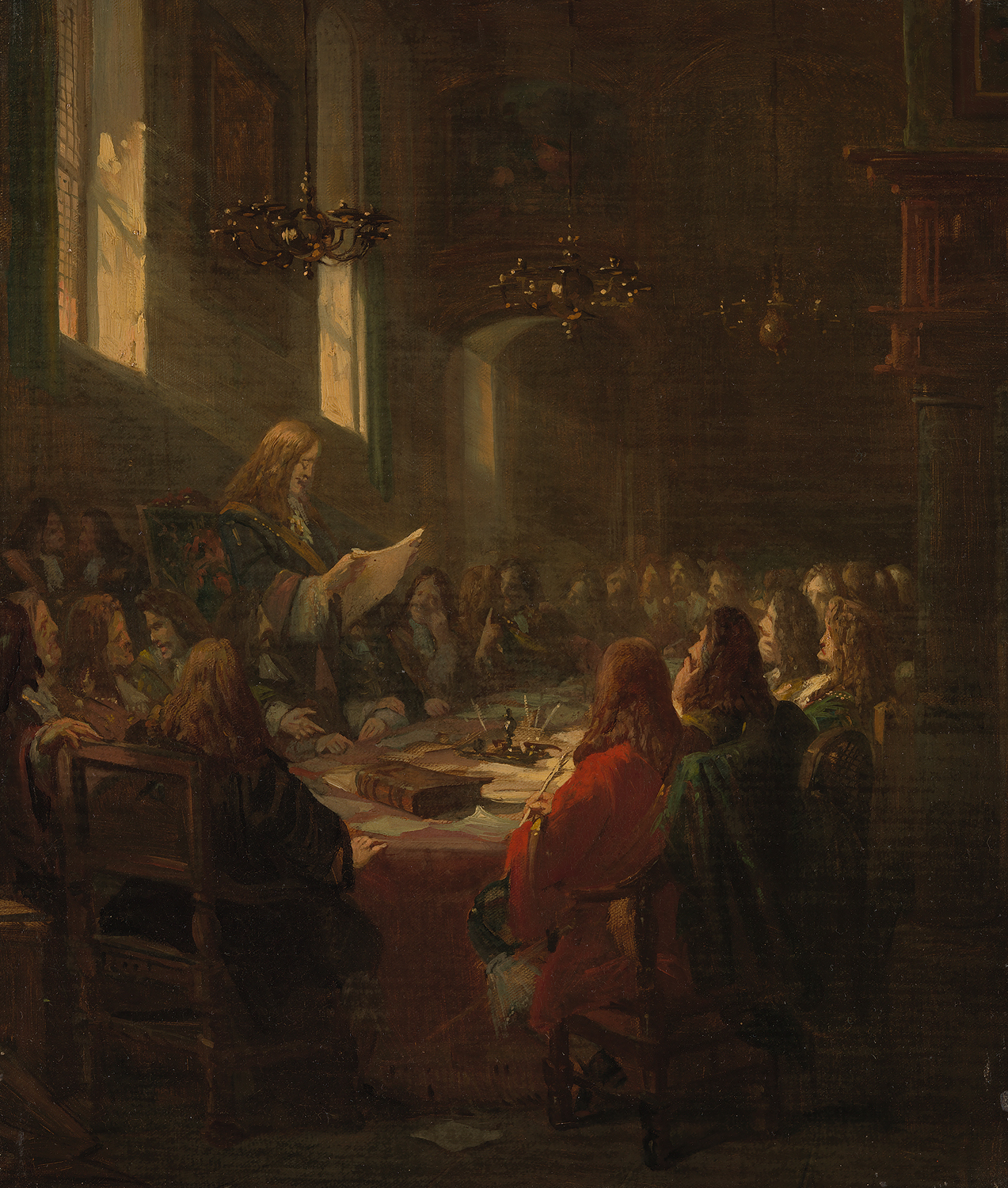
Painting of the Treaty of Ryswick's signing, which led to the controversy

The Standing Army Controversy was a major political and ideological debate in the Kingdom of England which began after the Nine Years' War ended with the 1697 Peace of Ryswick. Centred over whether England should maintain a standing army during peacetime, by 1699 the debate subsided when it was decided that the English Army would continue to exist in peacetime but in a limited size and under the control of the Parliament of England and not the English monarch. Though the English army underwent a major expansion after the War of the Spanish Succession broke out in 1701 the debate went on to influence future opposition to standing armies in Britain and the United States.

== Background ==
Prior to the mid-17th century, the Kingdom of England did not maintain a standing army, instead relying on the militia, temporary units raised for specific campaigns and Continental European mercenaries. During the First English Civil War, the Parliamentarians raised the New Model Army in 1645, which numbered 50,000 men at its peak and became England's first standing army. Though the New Model Army proved to be militarily effective it was also politically contentious and following the 1660 Stuart Restoration the army was disbanded. However, in January 1661 Charles II raised the English Army, which numerous New Model Army veterans joined. By 1688 under James II the English army had expanded to 37,000 men. Although the Bill of Rights 1689 required the Parliament of England's consent for a peacetime standing army, in 1694 under William III the English Army had increased to 94,000 men. During this period, English political discourse often portrayed standing armies as an important component in propping up absolute monarchies, including Robert Molesworth's An Account of Denmark, as it was in the Year 1692.

== Protagonists ==
In 1697 John Trenchard and Walter Moyle wrote a pamphlet An Argument, Shewing that a Standing Army is Inconsistent with a Free Government which started the controversy. Other Radical Whigs such as Andrew Fletcher and John Toland argued through pamphlets that a standing army endangered England’s constitutional balance through corruption, royal absolutism and threats to civil liberty. There was probably coordination between the pamphlet authors. There was also a Tory majority in Parliament determined to reduce costs who had in 1698 reduced the English army to 7,000 English-born subjects. Pro government Whigs like Daniel Defoe and the Lord Chancellor John Somers defended a limited peacetime force was necessary for national security and that parliamentary control of taxation meant there would be parliamentary control over the army.

== Aftermath ==
The army cuts undermined William's ability to negotiate on equal terms with France, and despite his intense mistrust, he co-operated with Louis XIV in unsuccessful attempts to agree a diplomatic solution to the Spanish succession. The controversy shaped enduring English and American Country Party and liberal distrust of standing armies, and helped to bring the naturally opposed Tories and Radical Whigs into a later alliance, the Country Party, against the Court Party of the Whig leadership.

== Sources ==
- Barnett, Correlli (1970). Britain and Her Army, 1509–1970: A Military, Political and Social Survey.
- Bailyn, Bernard (2017). The Ideological Origins of the American Revolution (Fiftieth Anniversary ed.). Cambridge, Massachusetts: Harvard University Press. ISBN 9780674975651.
- Chandler, David G., ed. (2003). The Oxford History of the British Army.
- Falkner, James (2015). The War of the Spanish Succession 1701–1714. Pen and Sword Books. ISBN 978-1473872905.
- Gregg, Edward (1980). Queen Anne (Revised) (The English Monarchs Series) (2001 ed.). Yale University Press. ISBN 978-0300090246.
- Macaulay, Thomas Babington (1849). The History of England from the Accession of James the Second. Vol. 1 (1st ed.). London: Longman, Brown, Green, and Longmans. OCLC 1069526323.
- Pocock, J. G. A. (October 1965). "The Standing-Army Controversy in England: 1697–1699". The William and Mary Quarterly. 22 (4). Institute of Early American History and Culture: 549–583. doi:10.2307/1922910. JSTOR 1922910.
- Robbins, Caroline (1959). The Eighteenth-Century Commonwealthman: Studies in the Transmission, Development and Circumstances of English Liberal Thought from the Restoration of Charles II until the War with the Thirteen Colonies. Cambridge MA: Harvard University Press.
- Schwoerer, Lois G. (1965). "The Literature of the Standing Army Controversy". Huntington Library Quarterly. 28: 189–212.
- Schwoerer, Lois G. (1974). 'No Standing Armies!' The Antiarmy Ideology in Seventeenth-Century England. Baltimore and London: The Johns Hopkins University Press. ISBN 978-0-8018-1563-8.
