= Cato's Letters =

Essays by John Trenchard and Thomas Gordon

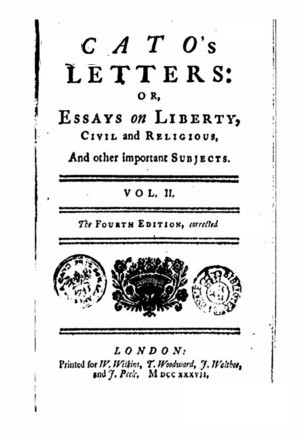

Cato's Letters were essays by British writers John Trenchard and Thomas Gordon, first published from 1720 to 1723 under the pseudonym of Cato (95–46 BC), the implacable foe of Julius Caesar and a famously stalwart champion of Roman traditionalism (mos maiorum).

== Purpose ==
The Letters were written in response to the South Sea Bubble and the corruption that the authors thought it embodied. They are considered a seminal work in the tradition of the Commonwealth men, being seen as an example of "extreme libertarianism".

They condemned corruption and lack of morality within the British political system and warned against standing armies, tyrannical rule and abuse of power. For instance "all History affords but few Instances of Men trusted with great Power without abusing it, when with Security they could."

== Beliefs ==
Forest McDonald listed the "oppositionist litany" as

- "a fear of standing armies;
- a rigid insistence that power must be restrained by a mixed form of government with checks and balances;
- an obsession with corruption, luxury and vice;
- a belief that speculation in the public debt and other paper wealth was the root of most evil;
- a nostalgia for a simpler, pristine agrarian past;
- above all, an almost paranoid fear of conspiracies of wicked and designing men to deprive the people of their liberties"

There was also a strong anti-Catholic theme in the letters with a warning that the Jacobites would bring back church lands and reduce Englishmen to "cottagers and vassals" of the church. There was a general anti-clerical tone with opposition to a range of Anglicans, with the exception of freethinkers.

There was also a cynicism about the principles of the parties, holding that whigs could be oppressive in government while Tories could call for liberty when out of power.

== Publication ==
Trenchard and Gordon had already collaborated in producing the Country Party newsletter The Independent Whig. The 144 essays were published originally beginning in 1720 until Trenchard's death in 1723 within the London Journal, later in the British Journal. The Letters were collected and printed in bound form in 1734 as Essays on Liberty, Civil and Religious. A measure of their influence is attested by six editions printed by 1755.

== Influence ==
A generation later their arguments immensely influenced the ideals of the American Revolution. According to Peter Karsten's Patriot-Heroes in England and America, Cato's Letters were the most common holdings on the bookcases of the founding fathers and the most quoted book in American prerevolutionary writing.

These letters were often republished in England and America and provided inspiration and ideals for the American Revolutionary generation. The essays were distributed widely across the Thirteen Colonies, and frequently quoted in newspapers from Boston to Savannah, Georgia. Many private libraries in colonial America contained bound volumes of Cato's Letters, and there are some estimates that half the private libraries in the American Colonies held bound volumes of Cato's Letters on their shelves. This has been shown as showing a preferences for "English" rights over John Locke's natural rights.

The Cato Institute, a Washington, D.C., think tank founded by Edward H. Crane in 1977, takes its name from Cato's Letters.

=== Historiography ===
According to historian Craig Yirush, Cato's Letters became central to the republican/liberalism debate thanks to Bernard Bailyn's book The Ideological Origins of the American Revolution. Forrest McDonald said that Bailyn put Cato's Letters, together with the writings of Viscount Bolingbroke and James Burgh in a group of opposition writers who kept opposition thought to James II alive despite them being marginalised by the success of the Glorious Revolution and allowed this thought to be "absorbed into the mainstream in America".

The libertarian Murray Rothbard said that Bailyn had found in the Cato Letters a "missing ingredient" that "transformed Lockean natural rights theory" into a "libertarian and anti-British framework" which contributed to a (realistic) conspiracist view of the British government. In a 1978 essay Rothbard said that Cato's Letters were the "most important shaper" of the revolutionary's "libertarian viewpoint".

== Sources ==
=== Primary ===
- Cato's Letters (Volume I)
- Cato's Letters (Volume II)
- Cato's Letters (Volume III)
- Cato's Letters (Volume IV)

=== Secondary ===
- Bailyn, Bernard (2017). The Ideological Origins of the American Revolution (Fiftieth Anniversary ed.). Cambridge, Massachusetts: Harvard University Press. ISBN 9780674975651.
- Mitchell, Annie (July 2004). "A Liberal Republican "Cato"". American Journal of Political Science. 48 (3): 588–603. doi:10.1111/j.0092-5853.2004.00089.x.
- Robbins, Caroline (1959). The Eighteenth-Century Commonwealthman: Studies in the Transmission, Development and Circumstances of English Liberal Thought from the Restoration of Charles II until the War with the Thirteen Colonies. Cambridge MA: Harvard University Press.
- Rossiter, Clinton (1953). Seedtime of the Republic: the origin of the American tradition of political liberty. New York: Harcourt, Brace.
- Rothbard, Murray (1 July 1976). "America's Libertarian Revolution". Reason.
- Rothbard, Murray (1978). "Modern Historians Confront the American Revolution". Literature of Liberty. 1 (1).
- McDonald, Forrest (1978). "Founding Father's Library: A Bibliographical Essay". Literature of Liberty. 1 (1).
- McDonald, Forrest (9 September 1990). "The English Revolution in America". New York Times Book Review. Archived from the original on 25 May 2015.
- Sanchez, Dan (3 January 2023). "Cato's Letters Explained "the Glorious Principles of Liberty" to the American Founders". Foundation for Economic Education.
