= Commonwealth men =

1700s British Protestant political reformers

Commonwealth Party
- Leader: John Trenchard; Thomas Gordon
- Founded: 1720
- Dissolved: 1750
- Split from: Whigs
- Succeeded by: Radicals
- Newspaper: The Independent Whig
- Ideology: Radical Whiggism; Republicanism; Christian socialism Anti-corruption
- Political position: Left-wing
- National affiliation: Country Party

The Commonwealth men, Commonwealthmen, Commonwealth's men, or Commonwealth Party were highly outspoken British Protestant religious, political, and economic reformers during the early 18th century. They were active in the movement called the Country Party and were centered on the Grecian Coffee House. They promoted republicanism and had a great influence on Republicanism in the United States, but little impact in Britain.

The most noted Commonwealthmen were John Trenchard and Thomas Gordon, who wrote the seminal work Cato's Letters between 1720 and 1723. They condemned corruption and lack of morality in British political life, theorizing that only civic virtue could protect a country from despotism and ruin. Clinton Rossiter stated "no one can spend any time on the newspapers, library inventories, and pamphlets of colonial America without realizing that Cato's Letters rather than John Locke's Civil Government was the most popular, quotable, esteemed source for political ideas in the colonial period."

Their criticism about enclosure and the general material plight of the poor were particularly notable to early twentieth-century scholars like Richard Tawney who saw in them a valuable though regrettably abortive form of Christian socialism that represented a preferable alternative to the view of Max Weber that Protestantism enabled and sustained the rise of capitalism. On the other hand, it has been argued that the Commonwealthmen "by no means stand against an individualistic or capitalistic spirit, and — despite what [for example, historians JGA Pocock and Gordon Wood] have claimed — are far from espousing classical virtue or the Aristotelian conception of man as zoon politikon [a political animal]."

Although nearly all British politicians and thinkers rejected the ideas of the Commonwealthmen in the eighteenth century, these writers had a powerful effect on British colonial America, with many of the ideas the American Revolutionaries put into their political system "were a part of the great tradition of the eighteenth-century commonwealthmen."

Although the commonwealthmen had little influence on British politics in the eighteenth century, their political ideas had a long-term effect on Britain's constitutional system: constitutional monarchy, which in turn became a model for other countries, for example, Sweden, Norway, Denmark, the Netherlands, and Belgium.

== Sources ==
- Bailyn, Bernard (1967). The Ideological Origins of the American Revolution. Cambridge MA.
- Colbourn, Trevor (1965). The Lamp of Experience: Whig History and the Intellectual Origins of the American Revolution.
- Kidd, Thomas S. (2010). God of Liberty: A Religious History of the American Revolution. New York, N.Y. ISBN 978-0-465-00235-1.
- Middlekauff, Robert (2005). The Glorious Cause: The American Revolution, 1763-1789 (Revised and Expanded ed.). Oxford University Press. ISBN 978-0-19-516247-9.
- Pangle, Thomas L. (1990). The Spirit of Modern Republicanism: The Moral Vision of the America Founders and the Philosophy of Locke. Chicago: University of Chicago Press.
- Robbins, Caroline (1959). The Eighteenth-Century Commonwealthman: Studies in the Transmission, Development, and Circumstance of English Liberal Thought from the Restoration of Charles II until the War with the Thirteen Colonies (1961 ed.).
- Rossiter, Clinton (1953). Seedtime of the Republic: the origin of the American tradition of political liberty. New York: Harcourt, Brace.
- Winkler, Heinrich August (2012). Geschichte des Westens. Von den Anfängen in der Antike bis zum 20. Jahrhundert (in German). Munich (Germany). ISBN 978 3 406 59235 5.
