= Mogens Skeel =

Danish playwright (1651–1694)

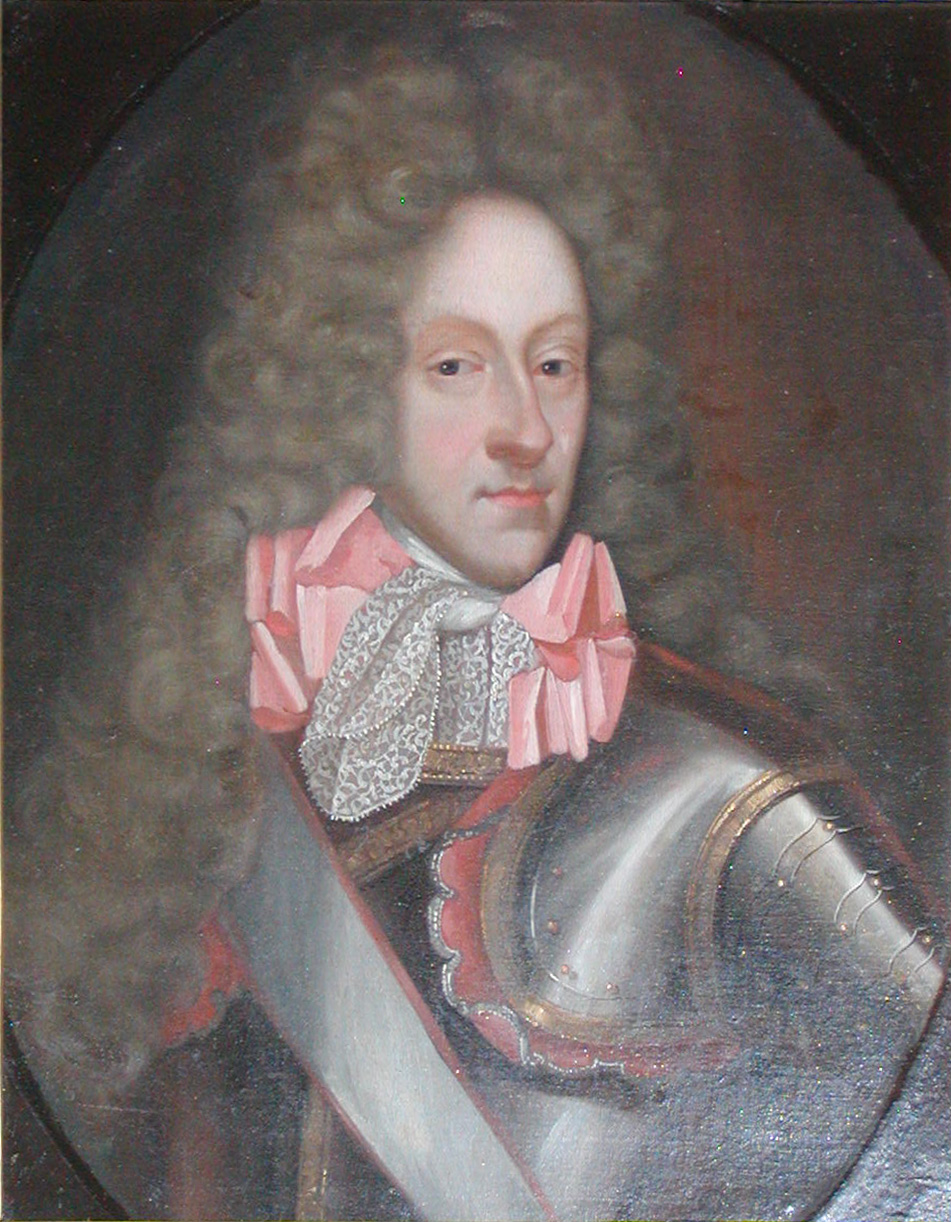
Mogens Skeel

Mogens Skeel (15 July 1651 – 5 August 1694) was a Danish diplomat, amtmand, and playwright. He is likely the author of the satirical play Grevens og Friherrens Komedie, which was written no later than 1675.

After military service under William Duke of Orange and being the Danish envoy the Brandenburg and Sweden he became the Danish Ambassador to England in 1692 just before Robert Molesworth's An Account of Denmark was published.

== Sources ==
- Robbins, Caroline (1959). The Eighteenth-Century Commonwealthman: Studies in the Transmission, Development, and Circumstance of English Liberal Thought from the Restoration of Charles II until the War with the Thirteen Colonies (1961 ed.).
