= English resistance to a standing army =

Pamphlet justifying the New Model Army, England's first standing army, on religious grounds

English resistance to a standing army refers to the long-standing political and constitutional opposition in England to maintaining a standing army in peacetime. Prior to the mid-17th century, England's national defence relied on the militia and temporary armies of conscripts, volunteers and mercenaries raised in times of war. In 1645, Parliamentarians raised England's first standing army, the New Model Army, during the English Civil War. The New Model Army demonstrated both the effectiveness and dangers of a professional army under centralized control.

Following the Stuart Restoration of Charles II in 1660, fear of military despotism shaped English political thought, though Charles raised the English, Scottish and Irish armies as standing armies in 1661. The 1689 Bill of Rights confirmed that no standing army could be maintained without the Parliament of England's consent, establishing the principle of civil control of the military. Despite continuing unease through the 18th century, especially among advocates of the militia system, a standing army became an accepted feature of the British state.

== Civil War ==
Charles I's attempts to rule without Parliament often centered around attempts to maintain armed forces without Parliamentary approval particularly in the war against Spain and the Bishops' Wars in Scotland.

In the lead up to the English Civil War one of the grievances was Charles I's attempt to raise Coat and conduct money without parliamentary approval.

Prior to the influence of Oliver Cromwell, England lacked a standing army, instead relying on militia organized by local officials, private forces mobilized by the nobility and hired mercenaries from Europe. This changed during the English Civil War, when Cromwell formed his New Model Army of 50,000 men. This professional body of soldiers proved more effective than untrained militia, and enabled him to exert control over the country.

== Restoration ==
The New Model Army was disbanded by Parliament of England following the Stuart Restoration of Charles II in 1660, when English views of a standing army became widely unpopular. There were three Militia Acts passed by the Parliament of England in 1661, 1662 and 1663. The Militia Act 1661 was a temporary act that proclaimed the militia to owe their allegiance to the King and not Parliament and prohibited local authorities from assembling militia forces without the King's approval to prevent such forces being used to oppress local opponents. This weakened the incentive for local elites across England to raise military units, and Charles II subsequently raised four regiments of infantry and cavalry, calling them his guards, at a cost of £122,000 paid out of his regular budget. This force became known as the English Army, and by 1685 it had grown to 7,500 soldiers in marching regiments, and 1,400 men permanently stationed in garrisons. Charles II also raised the Scottish and Irish armies as standing armies in 1661.

== Glorious Revolution ==
The Monmouth Rebellion in 1685 provided James II with a pretext to increase the size of the force to 20,000 men, and there were over 34,000 in 1688, when England played a role in the closing stage of the Franco-Dutch War. In 1689, William III expanded the army to 74,000, and then to 94,000 in 1694.

After the Glorious Revolution the authority of the standing army rested in Parliament, not the king.

== Country Party ==
During the Standing Army Controversy, nervous at the power such a large force afforded the king whilst under his personal command, Parliament reduced the cadre to 7,000 in 1697. Scotland and Ireland had theoretically separate military establishments, but they were de facto merged with the English force. There was strong Radical Whig opposition to the Whig government.

Mid-eighteenth-century opposition writers such as James Ralph argued that a peacetime standing army was unconstitutional and pressed for reliance on a militia; in his History of England (1744–46) Ralph censured William III for regularising the army and disputed Robert Walpole’s 1733–34 troop justifications.

In his influential work The Wealth of Nations (1776), economist Adam Smith comments that standing armies are a sign of modernizing society, as modern warfare requires the increased skill and discipline of regularly trained standing armies.

== Sources ==
- Barnett, Correlli (1970). Britain and her army, 1509–1970: a military, political and social survey.
- Childs, John (2003). "The Restoration Army 1660-1702". In Chandler, David G. (ed.). The Oxford history of the British army. pp. 46–57.
- Macaulay, Thomas Babington (1849). The History of England from the Accession of James the Second. Vol. 1 (1st ed.). London: Longman, Brown, Green, and Longmans. OCLC 1069526323.
- Robbins, Caroline (1959). The Eighteenth-Century Commonwealthman: Studies in the Transmission, Development and Circumstances of English Liberal Thought from the Restoration of Charles II until the War with the Thirteen Colonies. Cambridge MA: Harvard University Press.
- Schwoerer, Lois G. (1974). 'No Standing Armies!' The Antiarmy Ideology in Seventeenth-Century England. Baltimore and London: The Johns Hopkins University Press. ISBN 978-0-8018-1563-8.
