= Country Party (Britain) =

Country Party (1670—1752)
- Leader: Henry St John, 1st Viscount Bolingbroke
- Founded: 1670; 356 years ago
- Dissolved: 1752; 274 years ago
- Merger of: Commonwealth men Patriot Whigs; Tories
- Succeeded by: Patriots; Radicals; Tories; Whigs
- Newspaper: The Craftsman
- Ideology: Classical republicanism Parliamentary opposition Populism; Anti-corruption
- Political position: Syncretic

Country Party was the name employed in the Kingdom of England (and later the Kingdom of Great Britain) by an early to middle 18th century political movement that campaigned in opposition to the Whig Walpole ministry.

It was a term taken up by opponents of Walpole's Ministers of the Crown and the Court Party who supported them, which they claimed was acting tyrannically and against the interest of the British nation and its people. It took its name from a late 17th century grouping what would later become known as the Whig Party, characterised by its opposition to absolute monarchy.

== History ==
=== Original Country Party ===
The original Country Party was a faction which opposed absolute monarchism and favoured exclusionism.

In the late 1670s, the term "whiggamor", shortened to "Whig", started being applied to the party – first as a pejorative term, then adopted and taken up by the party itself. The name "Country Party" was thus discarded – to be taken up later by opponents of the Whig Party itself, once it had come to dominate British politics following the Glorious Revolution.

=== Country Party (1726—1752) ===
During the period from the 1680s to the 1740s, and especially under the Walpole ministry from 1730 to 1743, the Country Party was a coalition of Tories and disaffected Whigs.

It was a movement rather than an organised party and had no formal structure or leaders. It claimed to be a nonpartisan force fighting for the nation's interest—the whole "country"—against the self-interested actions of the politicians in power in London (the "Court Party"). Country men believed the Court Party was corrupting Britain by using patronage to buy support and was threatening English and Scottish liberties and the proper balance of authority by shifting power from Parliament to the prime minister. It sought to constrain the court by opposing standing armies, calling for annual elections to Parliament (instead of the seven-year term in effect), and wanted to fix power in the hands of the landed gentry rather than the royal officials, urban merchants or bankers. It opposed any practices it saw as corruption.

The Country Party attracted a number of influential writers (such as Jonathan Swift, Samuel Johnson, and Andrew Fletcher of Saltoun) and political theorists. The ideology of the party faded away in England but became a powerful force in the American colonies, where its tracts strongly motivated the Patriots to oppose what the Country Party had cast as British monarchical tyranny and to develop a powerful political philosophy of republicanism in the United States.

Contemporary opposition journalism fed into paired Country-Whig general histories in the 1740s: William Guthrie’s A General History of England (1744–51) carried the narrative to 1688, while James Ralph’s The History of England, During the Reigns of King William, Queen Anne, and King George I (1744–46) treated the post-Revolution decades, testing ministries against principles of liberty and economy and appending fiscal and military data.

==== Bolingbroke ====
Henry St John, 1st Viscount Bolingbroke was especially influential in stating the need and outlining the machinery of a systematic parliamentary opposition. Such an opposition he called a "country party" which he opposed to the court party. Country parties had been formed before, for instance after the king's speech to Parliament in November 1685, but Bolingbroke was the first to state the need for a continual opposition to the government. To his mind the spirit of liberty was threatened by the court party's lust for power.

Liberty could only be safeguarded by an opposition party that used "constitutional methods and a legal course of opposition to the excesses of legal and ministerial power…". He instructed the opposition party to "Wrest the power of government, if you can, out of the hands that employed it weakly and wickedly" This work could be done only by a homogeneous party "…because such a party alone will submit to a drudgery of this kind". It did not suffice to be eager to speak, keen to act. "They who affect to head an opposition, …, must be equal, at least, to those whom they oppose…". The opposition had to be of a permanent nature to make sure that it would be looked at as a part of daily politics. It had to contrast, on every occasion, the government. He considered a party that systematically opposed the government to be more appealing than a party that occasionally opposed the government. This opposition had to prepare itself to control government.

== Country persuasion ==
The historian Julian Hoppit has interpreted that around 1700 instead of a country "party", the English electorate, its Lords and its elected representatives had a country persuasion with key consensus demands that the government should be frugal and efficient, opposition to high taxes, a concern for personal liberty, a quest for more frequent elections, a faith that the local militia would substitute for a dangerous standing army, a desire for such moral reforms as temperance in an age of drunkenness, and less Sabbath breaking. The country leaders stressed the civic duty of the upper class to engage in politics to strengthen the national interest. Such views amount to the main counter to extreme High Tory hegemony and the similar bigwig Whig Party cabal which in its estimation morphed via other executives into the Walpole executive placemen.

== Americans ==
The writings of the country party, particularly works such as Cato's Letters, were eagerly devoured by some American colonists who came to fear the corruption of the English court as the greatest threat to the colonies’ desired liberties. They formed a Patriot cause in the Thirteen Colonies and used the country party ideas to help form Republicanism in the United States. Hutson identified country ideology as a major influence on the Anti-Federalists during the debate over the ratification of the United States Constitution. Similarly, Jeffersonianism inherited the country party attack on elitism, centralization, and distant government during the ascent of Alexander Hamilton and other Federalists.

== See also ==
- Commonwealth men
- The Oglethorpe Plan
- Green Ribbon Club

=== Other prominent Country Party adherants ===
- Richard Cumberland (1632–1718)
- Thomas Gordon (1692–1750)
- James Harrington (1611–1677)
- Thomas Hollis (1720–1774)
- Francis Hutcheson (1694–1746)
- John Millar (1735–1801)
- William Molyneux (1656–1698)
- Richard Price (1723–1791)
- Shaftesbury (1671–1713)
- John Trenchard, (1662–1723)

== Bibliography ==
- Bailyn, Bernard (1967). The Ideological Origins of the American Revolution. Belknap Press. ISBN 0-674-44301-2.
- Bailyn, Bernard (2017). The Ideological Origins of the American Revolution (Fiftieth Anniversary ed.). Cambridge, Massachusetts: Harvard University Press. ISBN 9780674975651.
- Bolingbroke, Henry St John (1738). On the Idea of a Patriot King.
- Bolingbroke, Henry St John (1749). On the Spirit of Patriotism.
- Colbourn, Trevor (1965). The Lamp of Experience: Whig History and the Intellectual Origins of the American Revolution. Institute of Early American History and Culture at Williamsburg, Virginia. ISBN 0-8078-0958-6.
- Hutson, James H. (July 1981). "Country, Court, and Constitution: Antifederalism and the Historians". William and Mary Quarterly. 38 (3): 337–368. doi:10.2307/1921952. JSTOR 1921952.
- Jones, James R. (1978). Country and Court: England, 1658–1714. Edward Arnold. ISBN 0-7131-6103-5.
- Kramnick, Isaac (1990). Republicanism and Bourgeois Radicalism: Political Ideology in Late Eighteenth-Century England and America. Cornell University Press. ISBN 0-8014-9589-X.
- Kramnick, Isaac (1992). Bolingbroke and His Circle: The Politics of Nostalgia in the Age of Walpole. Cornell University Press. ISBN 0-8014-8001-9.
- McKinsey, Elizabeth R. (1973). "James Ralph: The Professional Writer Comes of Age". Proceedings of the American Philosophical Society. 117 (1): 59–78. JSTOR 985948.
- Murrin, John M. (1980). "The Great Inversion, or Court versus Country: A Comparison of the Revolution Settlements in England (1688–721) and America (1776–1816)". In Pocock, J. G. A. (ed.). Three British Revolutions: 1641, 1688, 1776. Princeton University Press. pp. 368–455.
- Okie, Laird (1991). Augustan Historical Writing: Historiography in England, 1688–1750. Lanham, MD: University Press of America.
- Pocock, J. G. A. (1975). The Machiavellian Moment: Florentine Political Thought and the Atlantic Republican Tradition. Princeton University Press.
- Robbins, Caroline (2004) [1959]. The Eighteenth-Century Commonwealthman: Studies in the Transmission, Development, and Circumstance of English Liberal Thought from the Restoration of Charles II until the War with the Thirteen Colonies. Liberty Fund.
- Ward, Lee (2004). The Politics of Liberty in England and Revolutionary America. Cambridge University Press. ISBN 0-521-82745-0.
- Wood, Gordon S. (1969). The Creation of the American Republic. Institute of Early American History and Culture at Williamsburg, Virginia.
- Zagorin, Peter (April 1962). "The Court and the Country: A Note on Political Terminology in the Earlier Seventeenth Century". English Historical Review. 77 (303): 306–311. doi:10.1093/ehr/LXXVII.CCCIII.306. JSTOR 561547.
