= The Ideological Origins of the American Revolution =

1967 book by Bernard Bailyn

- Author: Bernard Bailyn
- Language: English
- Genre: History
- Publisher: Harvard University Press
- Publication date: 1967
- Publication place: United States
- Pages: 242 pp.
- ISBN: 978-0674443013

The Ideological Origins of the American Revolution is a 1967 Pulitzer Prize-winning book of history by Bernard Bailyn. It is considered one of the most influential studies of the American Revolution published during the 20th century.

== Background ==
In 1952, Bernard Bailyn, then a graduate student in history under Samuel Eliot Morison and Oscar Handlin at Harvard University, began receiving financial and career support from the Research Center in Entrepreneurial History. In 1956, critically inspired by George Bancroft, Bailyn challenged the dichotomy between "national self-awareness" and the study of history. A year later, Bailyn presented a paper on "Politics and Social Structure in Virginia", for a Williamsburg symposium sponsored by the Omohundro Institute of Early American History and Culture. The paper evaluated seventeenth-century and early eighteenth-century alterations in emigration, settlement, intermarriage, as well as "social and political structures in Virginia" that contributed to "the origins of a new political system." He expounded these contentions in The Origins of American Politics (1967–68).

At the end of his life, Bailyn disclosed that he had "wrote out" an array of possible approaches to history, "republican government", and popular sovereignty in the United States "and buried one of them in a small book on the history of education published in 1960." According to Bailyn, colonial and U.S. education had nourished a "distrust of authority." In 1960-62, he also reviewed the Jefferson Papers and Adams Papers, offering conclusions that framed arguments in The Ideological Origins of the American Revolution.

In the expanded 1961-62 version of Bernard Bailyn's 1960 conference paper, "Political Experience and Enlightenment Ideas in Eighteenth-Century America", the oft-cited first footnote contained a multitude of studies that contributed to the article and Ideological Origins, including those by Forrest McDonald, Caroline Robbins, Edmund Morgan, Perry Miller, and J. G. A. Pocock. Pocock later authored The Machiavellian Moment. Bailyn cited Franz Neumann for Montesquieu in Ideological Origins. Neumann's "Anxiety and Politics" (1955) in turn proved pivotal to historian Richard Hofstadter's conception of the "paranoid style." Conversely, Bailyn did not discuss Isaiah Berlin until his 2006 assessment of "perfectionist ideas" found in "Two Concepts of Liberty".

In 1994, Bailyn cast Ideological Origins as an inquiry into "the meanings and uses of words." Two years before his death, Bailyn "confessed" that "Mark Bloch, whose main writings—which so often turn on conceptual and etymological transitions—I had studied with great concentration...For Bloch, slow interior shifts in the meaning of words explained or reflected large social transformations", core tenets of political linguistics, linguistic determinism, and multivalent connections between psychology and emotions in linguistics as well as philosophy. Bailyn subsequently emphasized an "Emergence: re-reading The Ideological Origins, I realized how much of the book is about precisely that...shifts in the meanings of long-familiar terms and venerable practices—slight shifts, subtle turns—that proved to be transformative. The old words remain, but their meanings are altered." Bloch's "conceptual and etymological transitions" underpinned conceptual history rather than intellectual history, tout court. In 1998, Bailyn delivered lectures for the National Endowment for the Humanities and for the White House Millennium Council on significations in visual cultures and built environments, maintaining and updating his interpretation of the American Revolution. This elaboration and expansion became the basis for his approach to myriad facets of Neoclassicism in the preface for the fiftieth anniversary edition of Ideological Origins.

== Synopsis ==
In 1965, Bernard Bailyn published a renowned introduction, "The Transforming Radicalism of the American Revolution," to the first volume of the January 1965 Pamphlets of the American Revolution, a series of documents of the Revolutionary era which he edited for the John Harvard Library. Two years later, Bailyn published a revised and expanded version of this introduction, entitling it The Ideological Origins of the American Revolution. Bailyn argued that "the 'progressive' historians of the early twentieth century" dismissed "the Revolutionary leaders' professed fears of 'slavery' and of conspiratorial designs as what by then had come to be known as propaganda...in order to accomplish predetermined ends--Independence and in many cases personal advancement."

Bailyn distinguished "political liberty" in pamphlets collected by John Trenchard and Thomas Gordon from the " 'personal security, personal liberty, and private property' " rooted in a "state of nature." In contrast, "political liberty...was the capacity to exercise 'natural rights' within limits set not by the mere will or desire of men in power but by non-arbitrary law—law enacted by legislatures." But British "laws, grants, and charters... marked out the minimum not the maximum boundaries of right." His "colonists" transitioned from the initial goal of "political liberty" and "personal security, personal liberty, and private property" to a "theory of politics" that conceived of "liberty, then, as the exercise, within the boundaries of the law, of natural rights whose essences were minimally stated in English law and custom."

The "colonists" interpreted and appropriated ideas in tracts by Country Party pundits on "left" and "right" sides of the eighteenth-century "opposition spectrum", from Tory writer Viscount Bolingbroke to Walpole Whig Thomas Gordon, both counterintuitively described as the "'left' opposition." As a result, "these libertarian tracts, emerging first in the form of denunciations of standing armies in the reign of William III, left an indelible imprint... Fear of standing armies followed directly from the colonists' understanding of power." The "colonists" instead venerated "assemblages," peacetime "militias", and Minutemen. By the same token, Bailyn continued, "the colonists" praised "the spread of freehold tenure" as much as they did a medieval notion of "political liberty based on a landholding system."

Bailyn further examined the meanings of "power" in the pamphlets of the American Revolution. " 'Power' to them," Bailyn maintained, was "ultimately force, compulsion" with a 'sado-masochistic flavor'... its necessary victim, was liberty." This "liberty" was the concern "only of the governed", not "governors." He cited the writings of Kenneth Minogue and, in the footnotes, argued that the "sexual character of the imagery is made quite explicit in passages of the libertarian literature." Likewise, the antithesis of "corruption" in the British constitutional monarchy was the "virtue" found in British North America—"isolation, institutional simplicity, primitiveness of manners, multiplicity of religions, weakness in the authority of the state."

An offshoot of "power" was "sovereignty", the pamphlet meanings of which Bailyn held as "the question of the nature and location of the ultimate power in the state...Who, or what body, was to hold such powers?" According to Bailyn, this question, along with inquiries into "internal" and "external sovereignty", spurred incessant debates. Bailyn concluded with "the belief that ' imperium in imperio ' [sovereignty-within-sovereignty] was a solecism and the assumption that the 'sovereignty of the people' and the sovereignty of an organ of government were of the same order of things would remain to haunt the efforts of those who would struggle to build a stable system of federal government."

=== The Origins of American Politics ===
In 2021, historian Mark Peterson argued that "the separate publication of The Origins of American Politics...distanced [its] arguments from Ideological Origins, when ideally they might have been a single book." In three Charles K. Clover lectures on "social and economic history" delivered at Brown University in 1967, later published as The Origins of American Politics, Bailyn held that, as victorious merchants and landed gentry from Connecticut to South Carolina began to jockey for eighteenth-century legislative office, they simultaneously attempted to eliminate governors (and their councils) who distinguished "social and economic leadership" by provincials from "political leadership" by royal and proprietorial magistrates. The stage was thus set for "socio-political" notions to enter this maelstrom as "libertarian doctrines," derived from Country Party tracts published in England by "coffeehouse pamphleteers and journalists." In the 1998 "Politics and the Creative Imagination", Bailyn expanded his source base and analytical categories, including visual significations, from The Origins of American Politics.

=== 1992 Postscript ===
The postscript to a 1992 edition of Ideological Origins, which alone became the subject of a number of retrospectives, explored notional "interests" underpinning the Constitutional ratification debates as empowered "fulfillment" of "the ideology of the American Revolution." Yet, according to historian Gordon S. Wood, Bailyn's praise for the unity of "liberty and power", a particular ontological unity of "liberty" with a "remarkably formidable federal government", while consistent with his 1967 contentions, lacked critical evaluation. Wood repeated his dissertation observation that this specific unity as "fulfillment" was "certainly what the supporters of the Constitution, the Federalists, wanted everyone to believe." Antifederalists, in contrast, attempted to sustain "liberty and [federal governing] power" as perpetually oppositional. In Wood's opinion, Bailyn's "interpretation of the federal government" as "fulfillment" also underestimated the social impact of the Constitutional reconfiguration of "property" and "money" as "interests." In the early Republic, the notion of "middling people" pursuing their own elastic "interests", which came to encompass the material and non-material, spurred civic activism inaugurated by the framers. "Interests" resulted in a revival of state-issued paper currency and settlement after 1815 as well. Historians such as Alan Taylor, while not completely engaging with Bailyn's undermining of dichotomies in the 1967 edition, did study the transformative potential of notional "interests." Wood, however, believed that present-day readers yearned for more studies on this transformation as potentially enlightening. Conversely, Taylor narrated the transformation only as a "dark and sordid" affair of settler colonialism and chattel slavery. Moreover, many of these same historians, in commentaries on Ideological Origins, claimed that Bailyn's concentration on pamphlets was "limited" and "elitist." Wood pointed to comments and evidence in "The Transforming Radicalism of the American Revolution" that Bailyn intended for his interpretation to expand beyond pamphlet readers.

== Reception ==
Julian P. Boyd and Harold Syrett, who were, respectively, the general editor of The Thomas Jefferson Papers and the general editor of The Alexander Hamilton Papers, as well as military historian Louis Morton, comprised the 1967-68 Jury for the Pulitzer Prize for History. Bailyn had reviewed "Boyd's Jefferson" seven years prior to the publication of Ideological Origins. The three men unanimously recommended the book as the winner of that award to the Pulitzer Advisory Board. This Board subsequently awarded the book the 1968 Pulitzer Prize for History.

In 1968, the literary scholar Zera Fink, who during World War II had traced classical and renaissance influences on Puritan thought that in turn had influenced research by J. G. A. Pocock and Hannah Arendt, critiqued Ideological Origins for not addressing "Continental republicans" and republican thought harkening back to Renaissance humanism. Fink argued that the study of history had become "more specialized, more limited in scope, and specific detail in quantities on small matters has grown to proportions hardly dreamed of half a century ago." Yet, as evinced by Bailyn's "synoptic" study, "the view has had to be narrowed and the process has gone on to the point where...it is next to impossible for the mastery of all relevant material." Fink conceded that Bailyn had "demonstrated with far more detail than anyone else and with more applications a relevance" to "English constitutional thought" and the American Revolution than previous scholars. But Fink distinguished "republican thought" from Bailyn's "opposition thought" and arguments for its particular relevance. "Most emphatically," Fink declaimed, "it is not true that the author has realized his aim of tracing [back] the eighteenth-century complex of political ideas with which he deals." Fink further observed that "it is not correct to suggest either that this book elaborates a new and compelling interpretation of the American Revolution or that it brings wholly new evidence for the revival of what Professor Bailyn refers to as his 'rather old-fashioned view that the American Revolution was...not primarily a controversy between social groups undertaken to force changes in the organization of the society or the economy.' "

On April 13, 1970, less than a year before his death, an ailing Richard Hofstadter wrote Bailyn, expressing concerns about reviewers referring to their most recent scholarship as "consensus." Bailyn's arguments on "liberty" relied on demonyms and holistic categories such as "the colonists", "loyalists", and "Revolutionary leaders", yet foreclosed neither concurrence nor conflict, as evinced by then-student Gordon S. Wood. For example, in The Ordeal of Thomas Hutchinson (1974), Bailyn depicted the "increasingly irrational situation" as stymying Royal Governor Thomas Hutchinson's efforts to cultivate, and appeal to, a mutual "self-interest" among conflicting British "loyalists" and patriot "extremists."

In a 1976 assessment for Reason, economist Murray Rothbard praised Bailyn's continuing contributions to historiography. Rothbard lauded "the most recent and now dominant school of historiography on the American Revolution—that of Professor Bernard Bailyn—brings radical ideology, and radical libertarian ideology at that, into the forefront of the causes of the Revolution. Against the hostility of both of the older schools of historians, Bailyn has managed, in scarcely a decade, to win his way through to become the leading interpreter of the Revolution. Bailyn's great contribution was to lay out for the first time the truly dominant role of ideology." Bailyn, according to Rothbard, had realized that "what some historians have derided as [solely] the 'paranoia' of the colonists turns out to be not paranoia at all but an insightful apprehension of reality, an insight that was of course fueled by the colonists' libertarian understanding of the very nature and essence of state power itself...In the deepest sense, the American Revolution was a conscious majority revolution on behalf of libertarianism and against Power, a libertarian ideology that stressed the conjoined rights of 'Liberty and Property.' "

In "Bailyn's Crucial Breakthrough", a section of his 1978 essay "Modern Historians Confront the American Revolution" published in the first issue of Literature of Liberty by the Cato Institute, Rothbard repeated that "Bailyn discovered that Americans were indeed influenced, on a massive scale, by these [commonwealthmen] libertarian articles and pamphlets...The most important shaper of this libertarian viewpoint was Cato's Letters." He clarified that "Trenchard and Gordon, and the other libertarian writers, transmuted John Locke's abstract and often guarded political philosophy into a trenchant, hard-hitting, and radical libertarian creed." Three years later, the Cato Institute board of directors expelled Rothbard, who subsequently established the Mises Institute for paleolibertarianism.

In the same Literature of Liberty issue, Forrest McDonald praised The Gospel of Opposition: A Study in Anglo-American Ideology (1975) by Rodger Parker as an alternative to Rothbard's "the Bailyn [book]." McDonald explained that Parker's "work traverses some of the same ground covered by the most important students of eighteenth century English and American ideology—Caroline Robbins, Isaac Kramnick, Bernard Bailyn, and Trevor Colbourn—but he has been more thorough than any of them." In 1990, however, McDonald appropriated his own review on Faces of Revolution to extol Bailyn's thesis. Bailyn, opined McDonald, "made an unassailable case that the English opposition was central to the thinking of American Revolutionary leaders, anti-Federalists and Jeffersonians."

== Reassessments ==
In a 2018 retrospective of Ideological Origins, historian Gordon S. Wood argued that the reception of the book should be considered its own historiographical subfield. Wood pointed to reviews and comments by Robert G. Parkinson, T. H. Breen, David Waldstreicher, Michael Zuckerman, Daniel K. Richter, and Patrick Griffin that, in his assessment, demonstrated a limited comprehension. These scholars never acknowledged Bailyn's challenge to a "dichotomy raised by the Progressive historians of the 1920s and 30s, interests versus ideas, economics versus ideology." Historians who had deemed an iteration of "limited government", specifically in the regulation of landholding and trade, as latent in Ideological Origins, instead of manifest, were misled. As a consequence, "the placing of Bailyn’s supposed idealist or neo-Whig interpretation in opposition to a materialist-realist or neo-Progressive one reinforces what I believe is a false dichotomy between ideas and interests that has plagued the historical profession for generations." Wood clarified that Bailyn "was merely saying that the severe social and economic causes of the sort that lay behind other revolutions could never by themselves persuasively account for the American Revolution." Bailyn could also at once affirm that the book emerged from " 'a deeply [Atlantic] contextualist approach to history' ", and that the book "in itself will meet the needs of the present." This collapsed the dichotomy between history as pasts and history as an instrument of present "popular hunger" for " 'heroic' " validation of our "nation's origins." Wood reflected that "perhaps American history-writing has always been unusually instrumental", as Isaiah Berlin and Jack Pole (and Bailyn) had asserted about George Bancroft and additional historians. But present-day approaches to race, class, and gender were more overt and blatant than such twentieth-century scholarship.

According to Wood, Bailyn's reaction to the protracted reception of Ideological Origins was partially to blame for the confusion. Wood admitted that "so objectionable has Bailyn found the interpretations of the neo-Progressive historians that he has tended to dismiss evidence of any significant social conflict in the years following the Declaration of Independence. " Bailyn's framework for Ideological Origins, averred Wood, partially conformed with Bailyn's interpretation of Clifford Geertz's "Ideology as a Cultural System" (1964): "[formal] discourse became powerful when it became ideology."

In 1966, Wood had explored Bailyn's "conspiracy" thesis, arguing for "the ideas, [as] the rhetoric of the Americans" by considering that "Revolutionaries" believed their own "rhetoric" as "always psychologically true." Wood evaluated Carl L. Becker as never grasping this insight in his studies of "liberal" ideas on civil liberties, distinct from free and fair trade. For Becker, "ideas were merely refined tools to be used by the colonists in the most adroit manner possible." Wood further claimed that he was ultimately not countering the "Progressive historians", but rather "take[ing] back up where the Progressive historians left off in their investigation of the internal social sources of the Revolution." In the 2018 retrospective, Wood rephrased this thesis as "the ideas, the meanings, available to them."

Edmund S. Morgan and Cold War liberal consensus historians had rendered the Revolution as "simply a colonial rebellion designed to preserve democracy" against aristocratic strains of "private property", as well as against elements of British mercantilism sustained in the imperial system. Bailyn could instead "concede all of the economic problems and social aspirations, all the hidden selfish interests motivating the patriots [in social conflict or consensus]...and still legitimately maintain that it was the colonists’ belief in a conspiracy against liberty that in the end propelled them into Revolution... I believe that his intellectual map of social and political reality can absorb and account for all the examples of propaganda expressed by the Revolutionary leaders to incite emotions and passions of the populace." Despite a given eighteenth-century pundit deploying "language not to express his personal emotions but to arouse the emotions of his audience", Bailyn concluded that "the actions of the British government triggered a set of signals on this intellectual and emotional switchboard" that propelled politicos and audiences alike into revolution.

In 2021, historian Mark Peterson contended that the background for Ideological Origins shaped Bailyn's principal contribution to historiography--"taking ideas seriously." This emphasis, rather than "grandiloquent theoretical statements", contributed to Bailyn's belief that "language and rhetoric are not the only forms through which human beings express their thinking or convey their ideas", even if ideas initially derived from Bailyn's notion of "formal discourse." Peterson concluded that "the underlying premises about property and liberty of these eighteenth-century arguments lie at the heart of our altered condition of life." Peterson and his students continue to study not only the appropriation of Bailyn's "liberty", but also its "emotional switchboard", by partisans and peoples who politicked, included, and excluded each other in consonant dissonance. In this regard, Peterson sustains Bailyn's and Wood's disdain for scholars who designated both as consensus historians.

According to historian Craig Yirush, Bernard Bailyn described "the authors of Cato’s Letters (a text which, thanks to Bailyn, became central to the republican/liberalism debate), as 'spokesmen for extreme libertarianism', a term that recurs frequently in the book."

As Nicole Eustace has argued, among those with personal wealth, "genuine shared feeling" for "compassion", albeit with stoic restraint of the "pain of personal passions", reified "liberty" as public disinterestedness in political economy. Yet the compassion or benevolence "covertly encouraged personal passions" for socioeconomic mobility among " 'the lower sort', be they Euro-American, African American, or native American." This "acknowledgment of passion as the root of compassion" ultimately proved cathartic as the "pain" that became early Republic "sympathy", a connotation for accumulation, resulting in indigenous dispossession, partisan conflict, and what Eustace labels an "oxymoron", the "empire of liberty", rather than Wood's description of such an empire as an "alliance of liberty and power." Additional historians study "loyalist" sensibilities, disaffected noncombatants, and "happiness" as eudaimonia, all in the context of the "affective family" and patriotic "enthusiasm."

In 2022, The New England Quarterly dedicated an entire issue to the legacy of Bernard Bailyn. In addition to Peterson's previously published Notes, select essays featured brief forays into the constellation of methodologies, prose, and interpretations at play in Ideological Origins. Historian John Putnam Demos, for instance, offered a summary of Bailyn's response to one of the most common questions elicited by Ideological Origins: " '“How widely did this ideology extend?' " In his Illuminating History, Bailyn examined a Boston shopkeeper's 1500-page newspaper cache from the American Revolution, which contained lively annotations "much in line with Bailyn’s Origins argument." Bailyn also scrutinized sermons and articles by a country preacher in Connecticut as well as myriad township commentaries on the 1777 Massachusetts state constitution, all to reveal the "deep 'penetration' of the leaders’ ideology." Demos added that "ideology shaped the cognitive framework of Revolutionary participation, while emotion supplied its passionate, propulsive energy. Admittedly, this is not exactly what Bailyn himself says. But no matter, it’s there—abundantly so—in his presentation of the documents themselves." Demos subsequently evaluated Bailyn's studies on Atlantic migratory patterns and their entanglement with Johann Conrad Beissel's compositional frameworks---the basis of serialism and sonic spirituality in the Ephrata Cloister until its Revolutionary decline.

After Bailyn's death, the Pulitzer Prize Board released the 1967 jury report for Ideological Origins. In an introduction to the report, Sean Murphy contends that, "although conceding a superficial engagement with classical literature and a more substantive reliance on legal theory, Bailyn situated the emergence of American republicanism in an intellectual tradition that built upon the radical libertarianism of the 'country Party,' a loose coalition of Tories and disgruntled Whigs who dominated British politics during the first half of the eighteenth century, particularly as embodied by the writers John Trenchard and Thomas Gordon. In 'Cato's Letters,' their definitive work, Trenchard and Gordon lambasted what they saw as corruption and amorality in British political life, advocating instead for civic virtue as a bulwark against autocracy." Murphy concludes that "the themes of 'Ideological Origins...' continued to reverberate throughout his later work. On the cusp of the Watergate hearings in 1973, he offered what may be his most succinct exegesis of the period in a shorter essay on the central themes of the Revolution."

== Bibliography ==
- Bailyn, Bernard (1959). "Politics and Social Structure in Virginia" in Seventeenth-Century America: Essays in Colonial History. Chapel Hill: University of North Carolina Press.
- Bailyn, Bernard (1960). Education in the Forming of American Society. Chapel Hill, NC: The University of North Carolina Press.
- Bailyn, Bernard (2017). The Ideological Origins of the American Revolution (Fiftieth Anniversary ed.). Cambridge, Massachusetts: Harvard University Press. ISBN 9780674975651.
- Bailyn, Bernard (1968). The Origins of American Politics. New York, NY: Alfred A. Knopf.
