= The Independent Whig =

The Independent Whig was an eighteenth century British periodical written by John Trenchard, Thomas Gordon and a Anthony Collins.

The first two "editions" were published as pamphlets, the first in December 1719 at the time of the rejection of the Peerage Bill, and the second released in January 1720, on the upcoming peace treaty with Spain that ended the War of the Quadruple Alliance, as well as the strategic value of Gibraltar to England. After this the Independent Whig became a weekly paper which was published through to June 1721.

The weekly edition was strongly anticlerical and concentrated on attacking the establishment of the Church of England as well as the High Church Anglicanism of the time, which was suspected of having Jacobite sympathies. As well as being anticlerical there was a demand for free speech with a view that "if liberty were achieved, progress would follow".

In the fifth edition starting to distinguish authors by their last initials. It was first collected in one volume in 1721 and from that point on was published in book form.

To the fifth edition (1732) were appended 'The Craftsman,' a sermon, in the style of Daniel Burgess, also published separately, a letter to a 'Gentleman of Edinburgh,' and an epitaph on Trenchard. In a sixth edition (1735) there was added a third volume containing Gordon's letter to William Wake of 1719 and other tracts; a seventh edition appeared in 1743, and a fourth volume was added in 1747 containing tracts written during the Jacobite Rebellion of 1745. The book was mainly an attack on the High Church party, and on the title-page of later editions is called 'A Defence of Primitive Christianity ... against the exorbitant claims of fanatical and disaffected clergymen.' Thomas Wilson, bishop of Sodor and Man, tried to exclude it from his diocese, and got into trouble in consequence.

It was translated into French by the Baron d'Holbach.

== Sources ==
- Bailyn, Bernard (1967). The Ideological Origins of the American Revolution.
- Robbins, Caroline (1959). The Eighteenth-Century Commonwealthman: Studies in the Transmission, Development and Circumstances of English Liberal Thought from the Restoration of Charles II until the War with the Thirteen Colonies. Cambridge MA: Harvard University Press.
