= Anthony Collins (philosopher) =

English philosopher (1676–1729)

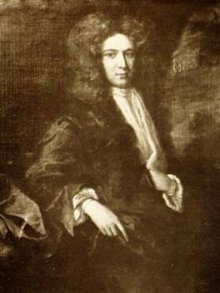
- Portrait of Collins by Jonathan Richardson
- Born: 1 July 1676 O.S. Heston, Middlesex, England
- Died: 24 December 1729 (aged 53) O.S. London, England
- Spouses: Martha Child (married 1698–1703); Elizabeth Wrottesley (married 1724–1729)

Education
- Education: King's College, Cambridge

Philosophical work
- Era: Modern philosophy
- Region: Western philosophy
- School: Deism
- Main interests: History, philosophy, theology

Anthony Collins (21 June 1676 O.S. – 13 December 1729 O.S.) was an English philosopher and essayist, notable for being one of the early proponents of Deism in Great Britain.

== Life and writings ==
Collins was born in Heston, near Hounslow in Middlesex, England, the son of lawyer Henry Collins (1646/7–1705) and Mary (née Dineley). He had two sisters: Anne Collins (born 1678), who married Henry Lovibond (born 1675), and Mary Collins (born 1680), who married Edward Lovibond (1675–1737), a merchant and Director of the East India Company. Mary and Edward's son was the poet Edward Lovibond.

Collins was educated at Eton College and King's College, Cambridge, and studied law at the Middle Temple. The most interesting episode of his life was his intimacy with John Locke, who in his letters speaks of him with affection and admiration. In 1715 he settled in Essex, where he held the offices of justice of the peace and deputy-lieutenant, which he had previously held in Middlesex. He died at his house in Harley Street, London.

His writings gather together the results of previous English freethinkers. The imperturbable courtesy of his style is in striking contrast to the violence of his opponents; and, in spite of his unorthodoxy, he was neither an atheist nor an agnostic. In his own words, "Ignorance is the foundation of atheism, and freethinking the cure of it" (Discourse of Freethinking, 105).

== Essay concerning the Use of Reason ==
His first notable work was his Essay concerning the Use of Reason in Propositions the Evidence whereof depends on Human Testimony (1707), in which he rejected the distinction between "above reason" and "contrary to reason", and demanded that revelation should conform to man's natural ideas of God. Like all his works, it was published anonymously, although the identity of the author was never long concealed.

== A Discourse of Freethinking ==
Six years later appeared his chief work, A Discourse of Freethinking, occasioned by the Rise and Growth of a Sect called Freethinkers (1713). Notwithstanding the ambiguity of its title, and the fact that it attacks the priests of all churches without moderation, it contends for the most part, at least explicitly, for no more than must be admitted by every Protestant. Freethinking is a right which cannot and must not be limited, for it is the only means of attaining a knowledge of truth, it essentially contributes to the well-being of society, and is not only permitted but enjoined by the Bible. In fact the first introduction of Christianity and the success of all missionary enterprise involve freethinking (in its etymological sense) on the part of those converted.

In England this essay, which was regarded and treated as a plea for Deism, caused a great sensation, eliciting several replies, from among others William Whiston, Bishop Hare, Bishop Benjamin Hoadly, and Richard Bentley, who, under the signature of "Phileleutherus Lipsiensis", roughly handles certain arguments carelessly expressed by Collins, but triumphs chiefly by an attack on the trivial points of scholarship, his own pamphlet being by no means faultless in this very respect. Jonathan Swift also, being satirically referred to in the book, made it the subject of a caricature.

== Discourse of the Grounds and Reasons of the Christian Religion ==
In 1724, Collins published the treatise Discourse of the Grounds and Reasons of the Christian Religion, with An Apology for Free Debate and Liberty of Writing prefixed. Ostensibly it is written in opposition to Whiston's attempt to show that the books of the Old Testament did originally contain prophecies of events in the New Testament story, but that these had been eliminated or corrupted by the Jews, and to prove that the fulfilment of prophecy by the events of Christ's life is all "secondary, secret, allegorical, and mystical," since the original and literal reference is always to some other fact. Since, further, according to him the fulfilment of prophecy is the only valid proof of Christianity, he thus secretly aims a blow at Christianity as a revelation. The canonicity of the New Testament he ventures openly to deny, on the ground that the canon could be fixed only by men who were inspired.

No less than thirty-five answers were directed against this book; the most noteworthy of which were those of Bishop Edward Chandler, Arthur Sykes and Samuel Clarke. To these, but with special reference to the work of Chandler, which maintained that a number of prophecies were literally fulfilled by Christ, Collins replied with his Scheme of Literal Prophecy Considered (1727). An appendix contends against Whiston that the book of Daniel was forged in the time of Antiochus Epiphanes.

== Necessitarianism ==
In philosophy, Collins takes a foremost place as a defender of necessitarianism. His brief Inquiry Concerning Human Liberty (1717) has not been excelled, at all events in its main outlines, as a statement of the determinist standpoint.

He was attacked in an elaborate treatise by Samuel Clarke, in whose system the freedom of will is made essential to religion and morality. During Clarke's lifetime, fearing perhaps being branded as an enemy of religion and morality, Collins made no reply, but in 1729 he published an answer, entitled Liberty and Necessity.

== Other works ==
Besides these works he wrote

- A Letter to Mr Dodwell, arguing that the soul may be material, and, secondly, that if the soul be immaterial it does not follow, as Clarke had contended, that it is immortal.
- Vindication of the Divine Attributes (1710)
- Priestcraft in Perfection (1709), in which he asserts that the clause "the Church ... Faith" in the twentieth of the Thirty-nine Articles was inserted by fraud.

Collins became renowned as one of the best read men in England. He was a bibliophile and book collector who amassed one of the largest private libraries of the time, consisting of some 6,906 books on all subjects, but particularly favoring works on history, theology, and philosophy.

It has been argued (see Jacobson, "The England Libertarian Heritage") that Collins was the unknown author of ten of "The Independent Whig" essays.

== Marriages and children ==
Collins married first Martha Child (1677–1703) a daughter of Sir Francis Child MP (1642–1713) and Elizabeth, née Wheeler (1652–1720). They had two sons both of whom died young, the eldest in infancy, the second was Anthony Collins (c. 1701 – 1723); and two daughters: Elizabeth Collins (born c. 1700) who, in 1738, married Walter Cary; and Martha Collins (c. 1700 – 1744) who, in 1741, married Robert Fairfax, 7th Lord Fairfax of Cameron (1706–1793). His second marriage was to Elizabeth Wrottesley (born c. 1680), a daughter of Walter Wrottesley, 3rd Baronet Wrottesley (1659–1712) and Eleanora, née Archer (1661–1692).
