= Jeffrey A. Winters =

American political scientist (born 1960)

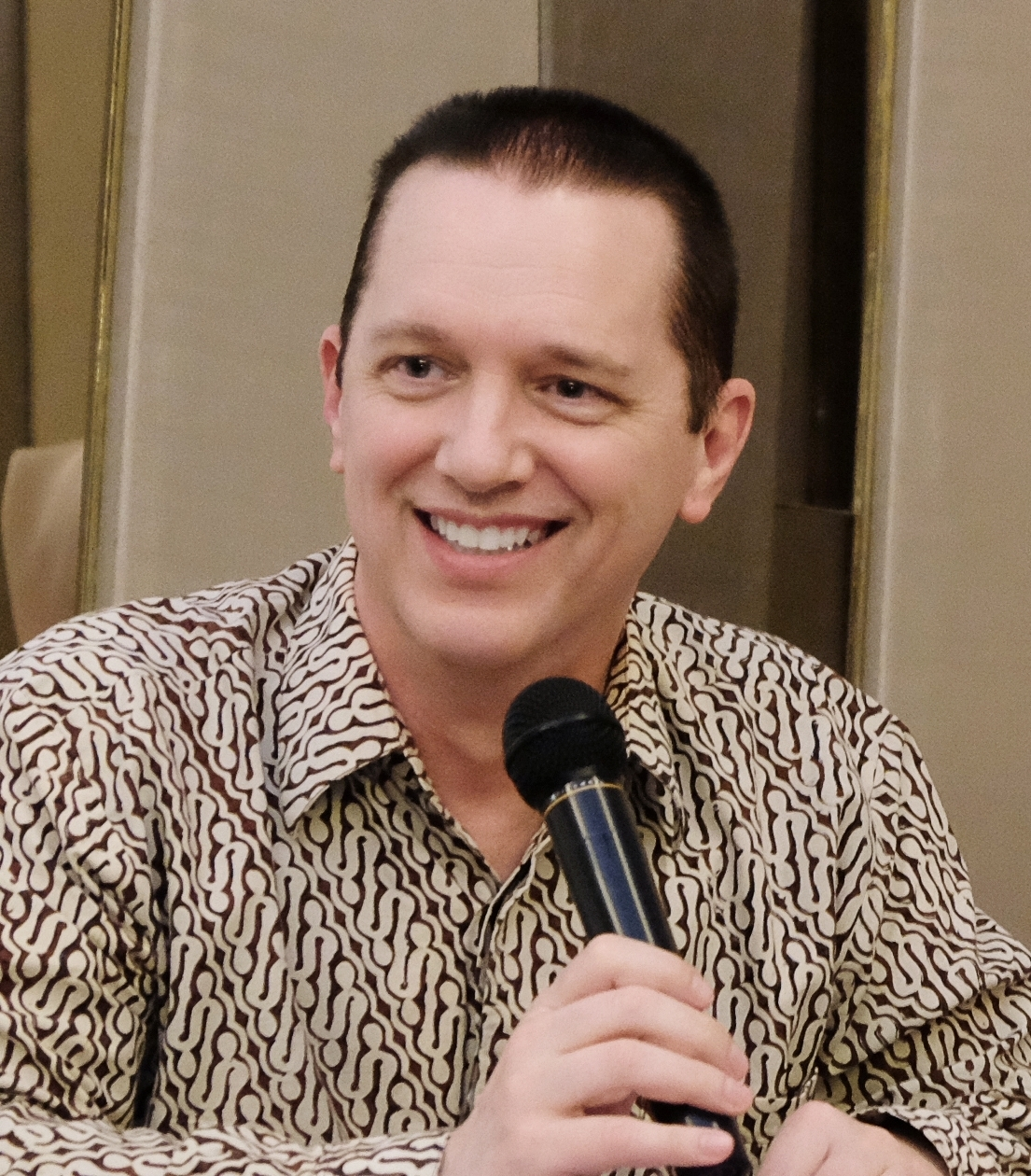
- Winters in 2019
- Born: Jeffrey A. Winters; Cleveland, Ohio, United States
- Occupation: Political Scientist
- Known for: Study of oligarchy, Wealth defense industry, comparative politics

Academic background
- Education: Yale University (Ph.D.)
- Thesis: Structural power and investor mobility: Capital control and state policy in Indonesia, 1965-1990 (1991)

Academic work
- Discipline: Political Science

Jeffrey A. Winters is an American political scientist at Northwestern University, specializing in the study of oligarchy.

He is a professor at the Weinberg College of Arts and Sciences, founding Director of the Equality Development and Globalization Studies program (EDGS), and past chair of the political science department.

He has written extensively on oligarchy in the United States. His most recent book is The Blind Spot: How Oligarchs Dominate Our Democracy (Scribner, Simon & Schuster, 2026). His 2011 book Oligarchy, published by Cambridge University Press, was the 2012 winner of the American Political Science Association's Luebbert Award for the Best Book in Comparative Politics. Winters is also a specialist on Southeast Asia, particularly Indonesia.

== Specialization ==
Professor Winters studies oligarchs and elites spanning ancient Athens and Rome, feudal Europe, contemporary Southeast Asia, and the United States of America. A central theme in his work is the relationship between oligarchy and democracy. Other important themes Winters focuses on are economic inequality, wealth concentration and wealth power, and the rule of law.

Winters began publishing on oligarchs and oligarchy in 2009. He is known for originating the concepts of "wealth defense" and the "wealth defense industry" in his analyses of oligarchy. In The Blind Spot he argues that oligarchy and democracy were deliberately blended together in the modern democratic era. Oligarchy is built into our democracies as a feature, not a bug. Winters calls the system that results "participatory inequality." He argues that oligarchs dominate us not despite democracy, but through it.

== Selected works ==
- Winters, Jeffrey A. (1996). Power in Motion: Capital Mobility and the Indonesian State. Ithaca, New York: Cornell University Press.
- Winters, Jeffrey A. (1999). Dosa-Dosa Politik Orde Baru [Political Sins of Suharto's New Order]. Jakarta: Djambatan Press.
- Winters, Jeffrey A. (2004). Orba Jatuh, Orba Bertahan? [Indonesia's "New Order" Falls or Endures?]. Jakarta: Djambatan Press.
- Pincus, Jonathan; Winters, Jeffrey A. (2002), Reinventing the World Bank, Ithaca, New York: Cornell University Press.
- Winters, Jeffrey A. (2011). Oligarchy. Cambridge: Cambridge University Press.
- Winters, Jeffrey A. (2026). The Blind Spot: How Oligarchs Dominate Our Democracy. New York: Scribner.
