= Grevens og Friherrens Komedie =

Grevens og Friherrens Komedie (lit. 'The Comedy of the Count and the Baron') is a Danish play. It was published anonymously in 1675, however, Mogens Skeel is considered its most likely author. This play is a satire over the introduction of titles in Denmark. The king, absolute ruler since 1665, had started appointing counts and barons, who outranked untitled nobles. The nobility was outraged. This satire is one reaction.
