= Court Party =

The Court Party was the name given to the supporters of the Ministers of the Crown in late seventeenth and eighteenth century Britain. It tended to be pro-capitalist and believed in centralizing political power, in opposition to the more agrarian Country Party.

In Scotland, Canada and the American colonies the Court Party tended to be the party that was closer to London.

There was similarly named centralising factions in contemporary monarchies such as France and Sweden.
