= Thomas Gordon (writer) =

Scottish writer and Commonwealthman (1691–1750)

Thomas Gordon (c. 1691 – 28 July 1750) was a Scottish writer and Commonwealthman. Along with John Trenchard, he published The Independent Whig, which was a weekly periodical. From 1720 to 1723, Trenchard and Gordon wrote a series of 144 essays entitled Cato's Letters, condemning corruption and lack of morality within the British political system and warning against tyranny. The essays were published as Essays on Liberty, Civil and Religious, at first in the London Journal and then in the British Journal. These essays became a cornerstone of the Commonwealth man tradition and were influential in shaping the ideas of the Country Party. His ideas played an important role in shaping republicanism in Britain and especially in the American colonies leading up to the American Revolution. Zuckert argues, "The writers who, more than any others, put together the new synthesis that is the new republicanism were John Trenchard and Thomas Gordon, writing in the early eighteenth century as Cato."

== Life ==
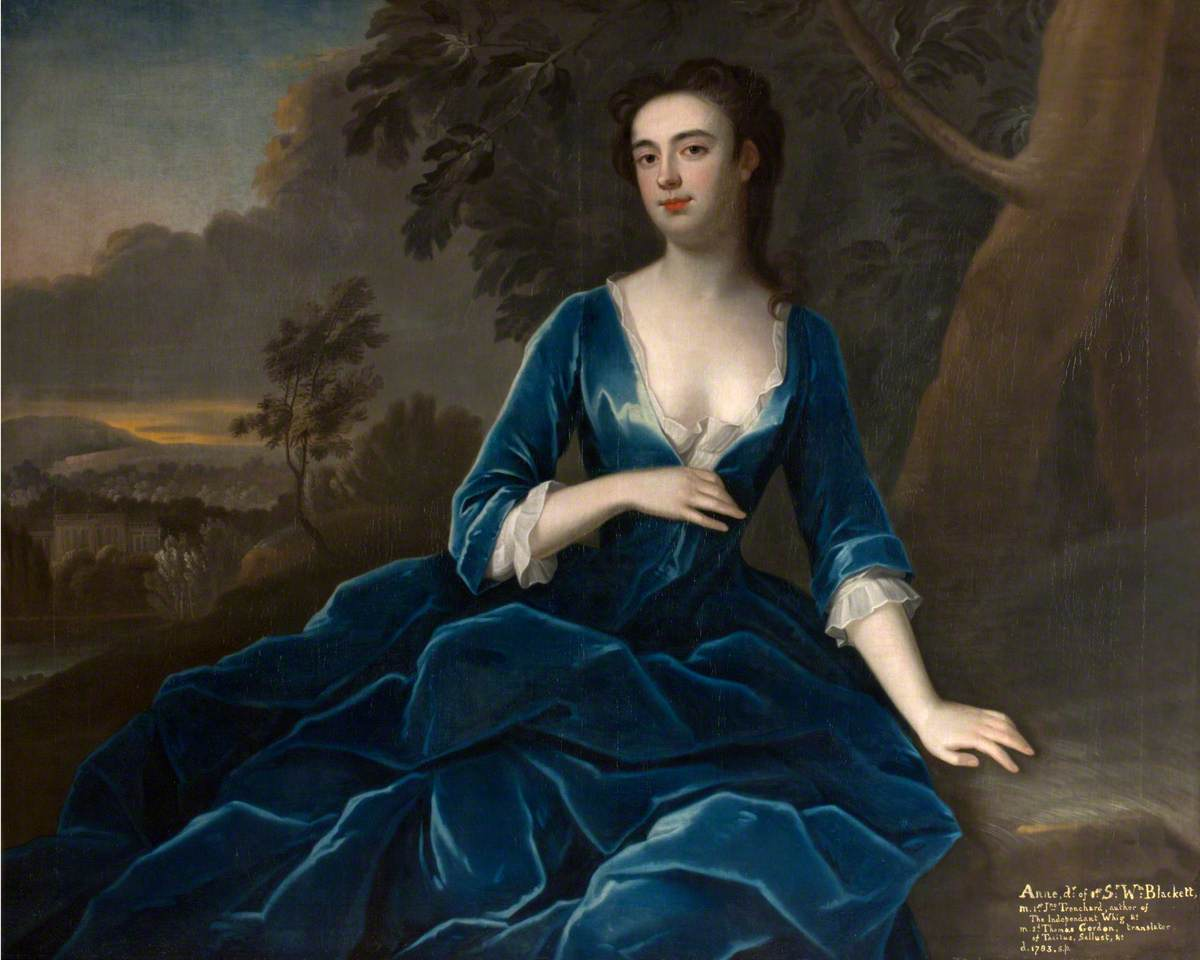
Portrait by Maria Verelst of Anne Blackett (d.1783), Mrs John Trenchard, later Mrs Thomas Gordon.

Gordon was born in Kirkcudbright towards the end of the seventeenth century. He possibly attended the University of Aberdeen.

He went to London as a young man and taught languages. Two pamphlets on the Bangorian controversy commended him to John Trenchard, a Whig politician; one was probably A Letter to the Lord Archbishop (i.e. William Wake) in 1719, who had written a Latin letter reflecting upon Hoadly, addressed to the church of Zurich. Gordon became Trenchard's amanuensis.

Robert Walpole made Gordon first commissioner of the wine licenses, a post which he held till his death on 28 July 1750. Gordon was twice married, his second wife being Trenchard's widow Anne Blackett which meant that he had considerable wealth.

== Works ==
He and John Trenchard started publishing the Independent Whig in December 1719, which evolved into a weekly paper and then published in volumes from 1721 into the 1740s.

In 1720 Gordon and Trenchard began the publication of Cato's Letters. They appeared in the London Journal and then in the British Journal until Trenchard's death in 1723, and were reprinted in 4 vols. in 1724. After Trenchard's death Gordon became less radical.

Gordon published, by subscription, a translation of Tacitus, in 2 vols. 1728 (dedications to the Prince of Wales and Walpole), which went through several editions, and seems to have been the standard translation till the end of the century. Edward Gibbon read it in his youth (Misc. Works, i. 41). John Nichols claimed that Gordon's commentaries on Tacitus were derivative from the work of Virgilio Malvezzi, Scipione Ammirato and Baltasar Alamos de Barrientos. In 1744 he published The Works of Sallust, with Political Discourses upon that author; to which is added a translation of Cicero's "Four Orations against Cateline." He published an 'Essay on Government' in 1747, and a 'Collection of Papers' by him appeared in 1748.

Gordon also wrote a preface to a translation from Barbeyrac called 'The Spirit of Ecclesiastics in all Ages,' 1722.

The unfinished draft of a History of England is now preserved in the British Library Manuscript Collections.

=== Reputation ===
A contemporary assessment in the pamphlet The Case of Authors by Profession or Trade, Stated (1758) styled Gordon a "Writer by Accident, not by Profession," suggesting that Walpole-era patronage left him "secure against any Reverse of Fortune," in contrast to full-time "writers by trade."

== Vegetarianism ==
Gordon, inspired by Bernard Mandeville, expressed strong disapproval with the mass killing of numerous animals for human consumption, stating, "it is very unreasonable that the whole Creation should be lavished away in this profuse Manner." He also argued that meat wasn't inherently the natural food for humans, asserting that it was merely cultural practices that led people to overcome their aversion to it and to disregard the cruelty inflicted upon animals during the slaughter process.
