= Wealth defense industry =

Mechanism to protect and conceal wealth

The wealth defense industry (also known as corporate wealth defence) is described as "an army of lawyers, consultants, accountants, and more who get paid millions to help their clients hide trillions" - and is generally thought of as a vanguard of economic and legal actors involved in sustaining and hiding activities which hoard wealth from a wider (poorer) community, be it a nation, area or government. The language describing the phenomena originates within the political and behavioral sciences.

A ProPublica report explains some of the mechanisms of the modern wealth defense industry.

== History ==
In an interview with Brenda Melina of the International Consortium of Investigative Journalists, The Panama Papers and the Paradise Papers are cited as well known examples of the Wealth Defense Industry. In 2017, Stanislav Markus and Volha Charnysh of Columbia and Cambridge respectively, performed a study of 177 post-soviet Oligarchs in Ukraine, and described Wealth Defense as aiding "oligarchs [to] benefit from direct power when the rule of law is weak."

A 2021 study examined the role of the Big Four accountancy firms as facilitators of corporate wealth defense. Analyzing 27,000 multinational corporations, the researchers identified three primary strategies used to minimize corporate taxes: the strategic placement of subsidiaries in offshore financial centers, the use of holding or management entities to transfer capital, and the creation of highly complex subsidiary networks to limit regulatory oversight. The study found that clients of the Big Four systematically employ these strategies at higher rates than clients of smaller accounting firms, with the effect being particularly pronounced among larger corporations.

== Stages and geopolitical context ==
Lena Ajdacic of Amsterdam University has described Wealth Defense as having three distinct strategies and also uncover marked differences across countries. In 2017, Jeffery Winters of Harvard University's American Society for Political and Legal Philosophy, identified Liberal Democracy as being complicit in the Wealth Defense Industry.

== Mechanisms ==
Shell companies and tax havens are cited as being mechanisms the Wealth Defense Industry. According to an IRS report provided to the Senate Finance Committee, 1.4 million wealthy Americans have not lodged tax returns during the years 2017 - 2020, reportedly withholding up to $65.7 billion dollars in revenue from the American government. It is understood that this practice is done consciously, as a means of defunding the IRS.

== See also ==
- Surveillance Capitalism
- Panama Papers
- Paradise Papers
- Economic inequality
- Culture Industry
