= British Journal =

English newspaper of the 1720s

The British Journal was an English newspaper published from 22 September 1722 until 13 January 1728. The paper was then published as the British Journal or The Censor from 20 January 1728 until 23 November 1730, and then as the British Journal or The Traveller from 30 November 1730 until 20 March 1731.

The paper published a large proportion of the Cato Letters.

== See also ==
- Burney Collection of Newspapers
