= Radical Whigs =

- Founded: 1688–89
- Dissolved: 1750
- Split from: Whigs
- Preceded by: Levellers
- Succeeded by: Radicals
- Ideology: Liberalism; Radicalism; Electoral reform Parliamentarism
- Political position: Left-wing
- National affiliation: Whigs

The Radical Whigs were a group of British political commentators associated with the British Whig faction who were at the forefront of the Radical movement and who had a big influence on the ideology of the American Revolution.

== Seventeenth century ==
The radical Whigs ideology "arose from a series of political upheavals in 17th-century England: the English Civil War, the exclusion crisis of 1679–81, and the Glorious Revolution of 1688. Broadly speaking, this Whig theory described two sorts of threats to political freedom: a general moral decay which would invite the intrusion of evil and despotic rulers, and the encroachment of executive authority upon the legislature, the attempt that power always made to subdue the liberty protected by mixed government." This political theory was mainly based on the writings of John Milton, John Locke, James Harrington, and Algernon Sydney.

Although they were supportive of William III's replacement of James II they could be critical, as when they opposed standing armies in the Standing Army Controversy.

== Eighteenth century ==
In the early 18th-century commonwealthmen were in the vanguard of Whig radicalism, in particular John Trenchard, Thomas Gordon, and Benjamin Hoadly, "praised the mixed constitution of monarchy, aristocracy, and democracy, and they attributed English liberty to it; and like Locke they postulated a state of nature from which rights arose which the civil polity, created by mutual consent, guaranteed; they argued that a contract formed government and that sovereignty resided in the people."

The radical Whigs' political ideas played a significant role in the development of the American Revolution, as their republican writings were widely read by the American colonists, many of whom were convinced by their reading that they should be very watchful for any threats to their liberties. Subsequently, when the colonists were indignant about their lack of representation and taxes such as the Stamp Act, the Sugar Act and the Tea Act, the colonists broke away from the Kingdom of Great Britain to form the United States of America. "Radical Whig perceptions of politics attracted widespread support in America because they revived the traditional concerns of a Protestant culture that had always verged on Puritanism. That moral decay threatened free government could not come as a surprise to a people whose fathers had fled England to escape sin. The importance of virtue, frugality, industry, and calling was at the heart of their moral code. An overbearing executive, and the threat of corruption through idle, useless officials, or placemen, had figured prominently in their explanations of their exile in America."

== See also ==
- Foxite
- Patriot (American Revolution)
- Patriot Whigs
- Philosophic Whigs
- Political radicalism
- Radical movement
- Whig (disambiguation)

== Bibliography ==
- Kidd, Thomas S. (2010). God of Liberty: A Religious History of the American Revolution. New York, N.Y. ISBN 978-0-465-00235-1.
- Middlekauff, Robert (2005). The Glorious Cause: The American Revolution, 1763-1789. Oxford University Press. ISBN 978-0-19-516247-9.
- Winkler, Heinrich August (2012). Geschichte des Westens. Von den Anfängen in der Antike bis zum 20. Jahrhundert. Munich (Germany). ISBN 978 3 406 59235 5.
