= Jack Pole =

British historian

Jack Richon Pole, FBA, FRHistS (14 March 1922 – 30 January 2010) was a British historian of the United States. After holding posts at University College, London and the University of Cambridge, he was Rhodes Professor of American History and Institutions at the University of Oxford from 1979 to 1989.

== Selected bibliography ==
- Political Representation in England and the Origins of the American Republic (1966)
- Foundations of American Independence 1763-1815 (1973)
- The Pursuit of Equality in American History (1978)
- Contract and Consent: Representation and the Jury in Anglo-American Legal History (2010)
