= The Eighteenth Century Commonwealthman =

The Eighteenth-Century Commonwealthman was written in 1959 by Caroline Robbins and traced the transmission of English republican and radical Whig ideas from the seventeenth century into the eighteenth, arguing that this intellectual tradition helped shape modern liberal and democratic thought.

The book looked at the British commonwealthmen tradition that although was decidedly whig had rejected Walpole and his successors whig ministries. Particular attention to Cato's Letters and then looked at radical thought in Ireland, and then at radical dissenters such as Richard Price, Joseph Priestley and the opposition to the American War of Independence.

The book has been highly influential in the study of early modern political thought, shaping both the Cambridge School’s analysis of republican ideology and the work of American intellectual historians such as Bernard Bailyn who drew on Robbins's concept of the Commonwealthmen to trace the transmission of civic republican ideas into the political culture of the American Revolution.

It won the American Historical Association's Herbert Baxter Adams Prize in 1960.

== Sources ==
- Fink, Z. S (September 1968). "Review of Ideological Origins of the American Revolution". The Historical Journal. 11 (3): 588–590. doi:10.1017/S0018246X00001746. S2CID 162949080.
- Pocock, J.G.A. (2019). "A Response to Samuel James's "J.G.A. Pocock and the Idea of the 'Cambridge School' in the History of Political Thought"". History of European Ideas. 45 (1): 103. doi:10.1080/01916599.2018.1535591. S2CID 195562352.
- Pole, J. R. (2004). "Robbins , Caroline (1903–1999)". Oxford Dictionary of National Biography. Oxford University Press.
- Robbins, Caroline (1959). The Eighteenth-Century Commonwealthman: Studies in the Transmission, Development and Circumstances of English Liberal Thought from the Restoration of Charles II until the War with the Thirteen Colonies. Cambridge MA: Harvard University Press.
- Rothbard, Murray (1978). "Modern Historians Confront the American Revolution". Literature of Liberty. 1 (1).
