= Lois G. Schwoerer =

American historian (1927–2025)

Lois Green Schwoerer (June 4, 1927 – August 10, 2025) was an American historian of seventeenth century England and Elmer Louis Kayser Professor Emeritus of History at George Washington University. She was born in Roanoke, Virginia. From 1976 to 2008, she taught advanced courses on the Renaissance, Tudor-Stuart England, and European Women, along with the survey course on Western Europe. She helped create the Women’s Studies major. She graduated from Smith College (BA 1949) and took a PhD from Bryn Mawr University in 1956. Schwoerer was elected President of the North American Conference on British Studies. She received awards from the American Philosophical Society, Folger Shakespeare Library, National Endowment for the Humanities, the Huntington Library, and the British Royal History Society. Scholars presented her with a festschrift, Politics and the Political Imagination in Later Stuart Britain (1997). She was awarded an Honorary Doctor of Letters from George Washington University in 2002.

Schwoerer contributed four articles to the Oxford Dictionary of National Biography.

Schwoerer died in Washington, D.C. on August 10, 2025, at the age of 98.

== Works ==
- Schwoerer, Lois G. (1974). 'No Standing Armies!' The Antiarmy Ideology in Seventeenth-Century England. Baltimore and London: The Johns Hopkins University Press.
- "Propaganda in the Revolution of 1688-9", The American Historical Review, 82.4 (1977), 843-74.
- The Declaration of Rights, 1689 (The Johns Hopkins University Press, 1981).
- Lady Rachel Russell: One of the Best of Women (The Johns Hopkins University Press, 1987).
- "Celebrating the Glorious Revolution, 1689-1989", Albion, 22.1 (1990), 1-20.
- ‘The coronation of William and Mary, April 11, 1689’, in Lois G. Schwoerer (ed.), The Revolution of 1688-89: Changing Perspectives (Cambridge University Press, 1992), pp. 107–130.
- 'The Varieties of British Political Thought 1500-1800,' ed. J.G.A. Pocock; co-eds. Gordon J. Schochet and Lois G. Schwoerer (Cambridge: Cambridge University Press, 1994).
- The Ingenious Mr. Henry Care, Restoration Publicist (The Johns Hopkins University Press, 2001).
- Gun Culture in Early Modern England (Charlottesville: University of Virginia Press, 2016).
