= John Trenchard (writer) =

English writer and politician

John Trenchard (1662 – 17 December 1723) was an English writer, Commonwealthman and independent Whig politician. He is best known for writing a series of 144 essays with Thomas Gordon entitled Cato's Letters (1720–23), condemning corruption and lack of morality within the British political system and warning against tyranny.

== Life ==
Trenchard belonged to the same Dorset family as the Secretary of State Sir John Trenchard. He was educated at Trinity College, Dublin, and studied law at the Inner Temple in London. He was called to the bar in 1689.

He leant William III £60,000 in 1689. In 1699, he served as commissioner of forfeited estates in Ireland. From 1722 until his death Trenchard was a member of Parliament for Taunton, sitting as an independent Whig. He opposed Robert Walpole's proposal to remit two million pounds owed to the government by the South Sea Company.

In a debate on 19 January 1723, he denounced the "great frauds made by the North Britons [Scots] upon the English" and moved that they should be subjected to discriminatory regulations. On 3 February, he pressed for an inquiry into the payment of malt duty in Scotland, asserting that "the Scotch had cheated us in everything"; he received no backing. Walpole described Trenchard's speech as an inflammatory attempt to break the Union. In March 1723 he opposed proceedings against one of the conspirators in the Atterbury Plot, arguing that the proper procedure should be a bill of attainder, but he did not get any support in the Commons. He died on 17 December 1723. He was married to Anne Blackett who after his death would marry Thomas Gordon.

== Works ==
As he inherited considerable wealth, Trenchard was able to devote the greater part of his life to writing on political subjects.

In 1697 he started the Standing Army Controversy by writing with Walter Moyle An Argument, Shewing that a Standing Army is Inconsistent with a Free Government and in 1698 A Short History of Standing Armies in England which was reprinted in 1731.

His approach was that of a Whig and an opponent of the Tories, especially High Tories and the High Church party. He developed anticlerical lines of argument in The Natural History of Superstition (1709), and The Independent Whig, a weekly periodical published in 1720–21 with Thomas Gordon.

=== Cato's Letters ===
With Thomas Gordon, Trenchard wrote from 1720 to 1723 a series of 144 weekly essays entitled Cato's Letters, condemning corruption and lack of morality within the British political system and warning against tyranny. The essays were published as Essays on Liberty, Civil and Religious, first in the London Journal and then in the British Journal. These essays became a cornerstone of the Commonwealthmen tradition. In August 1721, the government seized paper's relating to the Cato's Letters and broke the press on which they were being printed; subsequent negotiations enabled the essays to continue to be printed.

== See also ==
- Republicanism
- Liberalism
- Contributions to liberal theory

Parliament of Great Britain
Preceded by James Smith; William Pynsent	Member of Parliament for Taunton; 1722–1723; With: James Smith	Succeeded by Abraham Elton; James Smith
