= Caroline Robbins =

British historian (1903–1999)

- Born: 18 August 1903; Middlesex, England
- Died: 8 February 1999 (aged 95); Valley Forge, Pennsylvania, USA

Caroline Robbins or Caroline Herben (18 August 1903 – 8 February 1999) was a British historian who was a professor at Bryn Mawr College.

== Life ==
Robbins was born in Middlesex in 1903. Her parents were Rowland Richard (1872–1960) and Rosa Marion Robbins (nee Harris). Her father was a farmer and he was a Councillor on the Middlesex County Council. Her brother, Lionel, would become an economist. The family were Strict Baptists and she identified with the English Nonconformist tradition.

She took her doctorate at London University with a treatise on Andrew Marvell. Robbins became an instructor in British history at Bryn Mawr College in 1929. She served in that department for 42 years. She wrote The Eighteenth Century Commonwealthman in 1959.

She married Stephen J. Herben Jr., who was also a professor at Bryn Mawr, in 1932. Robbins died in Valley Forge, Pennsylvania in 1999. After she died a professorship was founded in her name.

== Intellectual Influence ==
The Eighteenth Century Commonwealthman was published in 1959 and traced the transmission of English republican and radical Whig ideas from the seventeenth century into the eighteenth, arguing that this intellectual tradition helped shape modern liberal and democratic thought. The book has been highly influential in the study of early modern political thought, shaping both the Cambridge School’s analysis of republican ideology and the work of American intellectual historians such as Bernard Bailyn who drew on Robbins’s concept of the Commonwealthmen to trace the transmission of civic republican ideas into the political culture of the American Revolution.

== Works ==
- Robbins, Caroline (1959). The Eighteenth-Century Commonwealthman: Studies in the Transmission, Development and Circumstances of English Liberal Thought from the Restoration of Charles II until the War with the Thirteen Colonies. Cambridge MA: Harvard University Press.
- Two English Republican Tracts. Cambridge University Press, 1969.
- Barbara Taft: Absolute Liberty: A Selection from the Articles and Papers of Caroline Robbins. Archon Books, Hamden CN 1982. ISBN 0-208-01955-3
