= History of liberalism =

Liberalism, the belief in freedom, equality, democracy and human rights, is historically associated with thinkers such as John Locke and Montesquieu, and with constitutionally limiting the power of the monarch, affirming parliamentary supremacy, passing the Bill of Rights and establishing the principle of "consent of the governed". The 1776 Declaration of Independence of the United States founded the nascent republic on liberal principles without the encumbrance of hereditary aristocracy—the declaration stated that "all men are created equal and endowed by their creator with certain unalienable rights, among these life, liberty, and the pursuit of happiness". A few years later, the French Revolution overthrew the hereditary aristocracy, with the slogan "liberty, equality, fraternity" and was the first state in history to grant universal male suffrage. The Declaration of the Rights of Man and of the Citizen, first codified in 1789 in France, is a foundational document of both liberalism and human rights, itself based on the U.S. Declaration of Independence. The intellectual progress of the Enlightenment, which questioned old traditions about societies and governments, eventually coalesced into powerful revolutionary movements that toppled what the French called the Ancien Régime, the belief in absolute monarchy and established religion, especially in Europe, Latin America and North America.

William Henry of Orange in the Glorious Revolution, Thomas Jefferson in the American Revolution and Lafayette in the French Revolution used liberal philosophy to justify the armed overthrow of what they saw as tyrannical rule. The 19th century saw liberal governments established in nations across Europe, South America and North America. In this period, the dominant ideological opponent of classical liberalism was conservatism, but liberalism later survived major ideological challenges from new opponents, such as fascism and communism. Liberal government often adopted the economic beliefs espoused by Adam Smith, John Stuart Mill and others, which broadly emphasized the importance of free markets and laissez-faire governance, with a minimum of interference in trade.

During 19th and early 20th century in the Ottoman Empire and Middle East, liberalism influenced periods of reform such as the Tanzimat and Nahda and the rise of secularism, constitutionalism and nationalism. These changes, along with other factors, helped to create a sense of crisis within Islam which continues to this day—this led to Islamic revivalism. During the 20th century, liberal ideas spread even further as liberal democracies found themselves on the winning side in both world wars. In Europe and North America, the establishment of social liberalism (often called simply "liberalism" in the United States) became a key component in the expansion of the welfare state. Today, liberal parties continue to wield power, control and influence throughout the world, but it still has challenges to overcome in Latin America, Africa and Asia. Later waves of modern liberal thought and struggle were strongly influenced by the need to expand civil rights. Liberals have advocated for gender equality, marriage equality and racial equality and a global social movement for civil rights in the 20th century achieved several objectives towards those goals.

== Early history ==
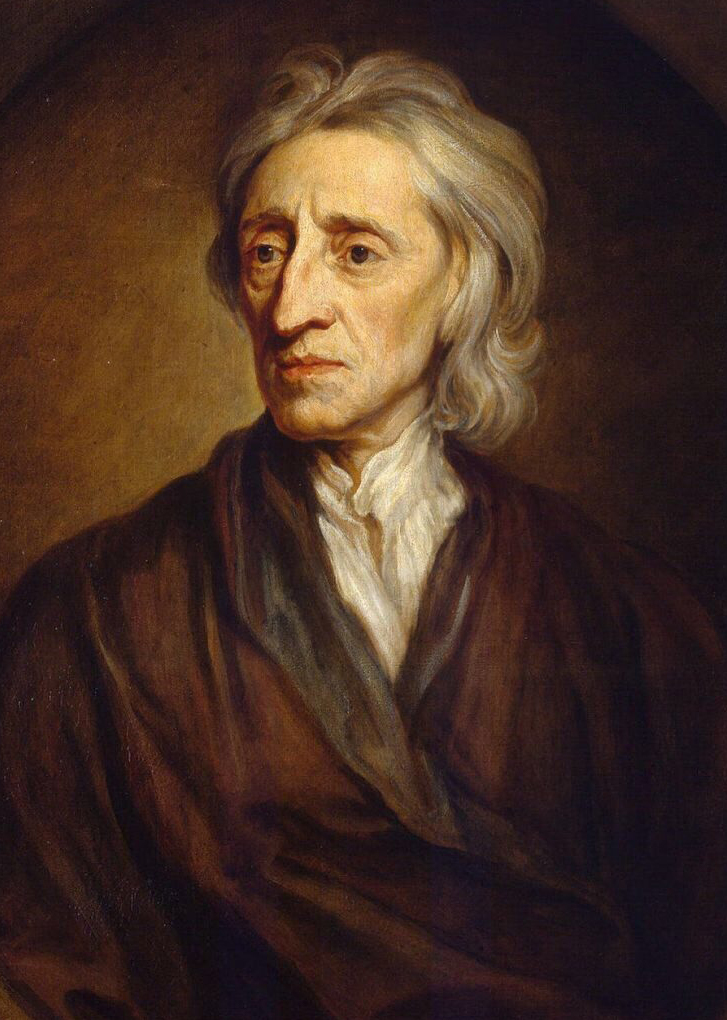
John Locke was the first to develop a liberal philosophy as he coherently described the elementary principles of the liberal movement, such as the right to private property and the consent of the governed.

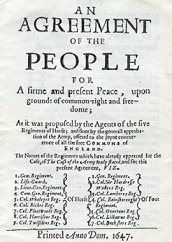
The Agreement of the People (1647), a manifesto for political change proposed by the Levellers during the English Civil War, called for freedom of religion, frequent convening of Parliament and equality under the law

Isolated strands of liberal thought had existed in Eastern philosophy since the Chinese Spring and Autumn period and Western philosophy since the Ancient Greeks, but the first major signs of liberal politics emerged in modern times. The economist Murray Rothbard claimed that Chinese Taoist philosopher Laozi was the first libertarian, likening Laozi's ideas on government to Friedrich Hayek's theory of spontaneous order. Many of the liberal concepts of Locke were foreshadowed in the radical ideas that were freely aired at the time. The pamphleteer Richard Overton wrote: "To every Individuall in nature, is given an individual property by nature, not to be invaded or usurped by any...; no man hath power over my rights and liberties, and I over no mans". These ideas were first unified as a distinct ideology by the English philosopher John Locke, generally regarded as the father of modern liberalism. Locke developed the radical notion that government acquires consent from the governed, which has to be constantly present for a government to remain legitimate. His influential Two Treatises (1690), the foundational text of liberal ideology, outlined his major ideas. His insistence that lawful government did not have a supernatural basis was a sharp break from previous theories of governance. Locke also defined the concept of the separation of church and state. Based on the social contract principle, Locke argued that there was a natural right to the liberty of conscience, which he argued must therefore remain protected from any government authority. He also formulated a general defence for religious toleration in his Letter Concerning Toleration. Locke was influenced by the liberal ideas of John Milton, who was a staunch advocate of freedom in all its forms.

Milton argued for disestablishment as the only effective way of achieving broad toleration. In his Areopagitica, Milton provided one of the first arguments for the importance of freedom of speech—"the liberty to know, to utter, and to argue freely according to conscience, above all liberties". Algernon Sidney was second only to John Locke in his influence on liberal political thought in eighteenth-century Britain and Colonial America, and was widely read and quoted by the Whig opposition during the Glorious Revolution. Sidney's argument that "free men always have the right to resist tyrannical government" was widely quoted by the Patriots at the time of American Revolutionary War and Thomas Jefferson considered Sidney to have been one of the two primary sources for the Founding Fathers' view of liberty. Sidney believed that absolute monarchy was a great political evil and his major work, Discourses Concerning Government, was written during the Exclusion Crisis, as a response to Robert Filmer's Patriarcha, a defence of divine right monarchy. Sidney firmly rejected Filmer's reactionary principles and argued that the subjects of the monarch were entitled by right to share in the government through advice and counsel.

== Glorious Revolution ==
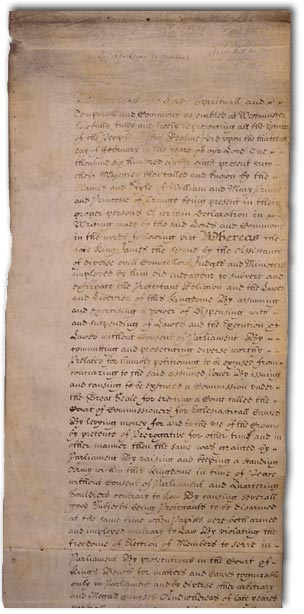
The Bill of Rights was a landmark piece of liberal legislation.

Isolated strands of liberal thought that had existed in Western philosophy since the Ancient Greeks began to coalesce at the time of the English Civil War. Disputes between the Parliament and King Charles I over political supremacy sparked a massive civil war in the 1640s, which culminated in Charles' execution and the establishment of a Republic. In particular, the Levellers, a radical political movement of the period, published their manifesto Agreement of the People which advocated popular sovereignty, an extended voting suffrage, religious tolerance and equality before the law. The impact of liberal ideas steadily increased during the 17th century in England, culminating in the Glorious Revolution of 1688, which enshrined parliamentary sovereignty and the right of revolution, and led to the establishment of what many consider the first modern, liberal state. Significant legislative milestones in this period included the Habeas Corpus Act 1679, which strengthened the convention that forbade detention lacking sufficient cause or evidence. The Bill of Rights formally established the supremacy of the law and of parliament over the monarch and laid down basic rights for all Englishmen. The bill made royal interference with the law and with elections to parliament illegal, made the agreement of parliament necessary for the implementation of any new taxes and outlawed the maintenance of a standing army during peacetime without parliament's consent. The right to petition the monarch was granted to everyone and "cruel and unusual punishments" were made illegal under all circumstances. This was followed a year later with the Act of Toleration, which drew its ideological content from John Locke's four letters advocating religious toleration. The Act allowed freedom of worship to Nonconformists who refused to pledge oaths of Allegiance and Supremacy to the Anglican Church. In 1695, the Commons refused to renew the Licensing of the Press Act 1662, leading to a continuous period of unprecedented freedom of the press.

== Age of Enlightenment ==
The development of liberalism continued throughout the 18th century with the burgeoning Enlightenment ideals of the era. This was a period of profound intellectual vitality that questioned old traditions and influenced several European monarchies throughout the 18th century. In contrast to England, the French experience in the 18th century was characterised by the perpetuation of feudal payments and rights and absolutism. Ideas that challenged the status quo were often harshly repressed. Most of the philosophes of the French Enlightenment were progressive in the liberal sense and advocated the reform of the French system of government along more constitutional and liberal lines. The American Enlightenment is a period of intellectual ferment in the thirteen American colonies in the period 1714–1818, which led to the American Revolution and the creation of the American Republic. Influenced by the 18th-century European Enlightenment and its own native American Philosophy, the American Enlightenment applied scientific reasoning to politics, science and religion, promoted religious tolerance, and restored literature, the arts, and music as important disciplines and professions worthy of study in colleges.

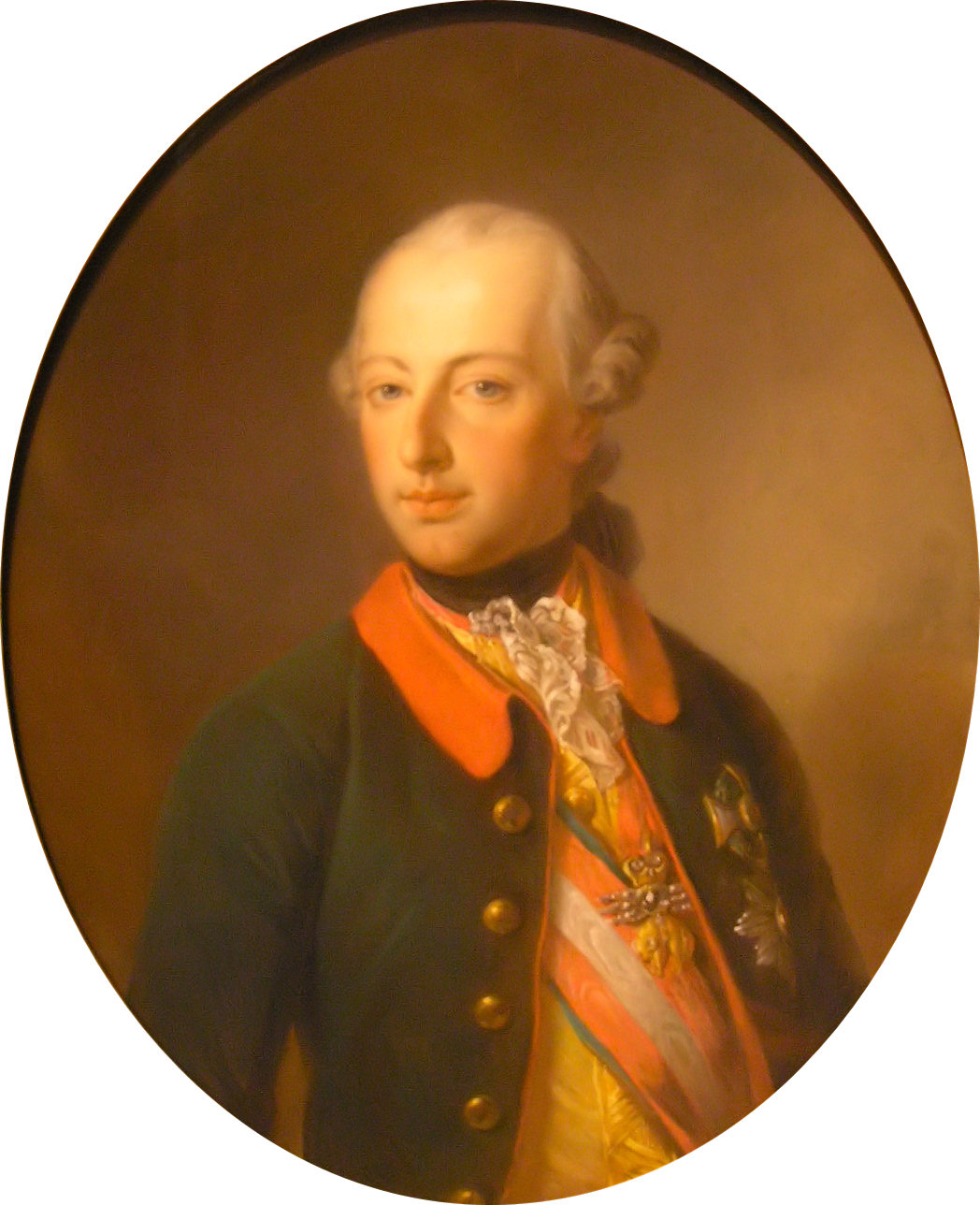
Joseph II of Austria was an archetypal enlightened despot and although he maintained a belief in absolutist monarchy, he also championed a series of liberal reforms.

A prominent example of a monarch who took the Enlightenment project seriously was Joseph II of Austria, who ruled from 1780 to 1790 and implemented a wide array of radical reforms, such as the complete abolition of serfdom, the imposition of equal taxation policies between the aristocracy and the peasantry, the institution of religious toleration, including equal civil rights for Jews and the suppression of Catholic religious authority throughout his empire, creating a more secular nation. Besides the Enlightenment, a rising tide of industrialization and urbanization in Western Europe during the 18th century also contributed to the growth of liberal society by spurring commercial and entrepreneurial activity.

In the early 18th century, the Commonwealth men and the Country Party in England, promoted republicanism and condemned the perceived widespread corruption and lack of morality during the Walpole era, theorizing that only civic virtue could protect a country from despotism and ruin. A series of essays, known as Cato's Letters, published in the London Journal during the 1720s and written by John Trenchard and Thomas Gordon, condemned tyranny and advanced principles of freedom of conscience and freedom of speech. They were an important influence on the development of Republicanism in the United States.

In the 1760s, the "Middlesex radicals", led by the politician John Wilkes who was expelled from the House of Commons for seditious libel, founded the Society for the Defence of the Bill of Rights and developed the belief that every man had the right to vote and "natural reason" enabled him to properly judge political issues. Liberty consisted in frequent elections. This was to begin a long tradition of British radicalism.

=== French Enlightenment ===
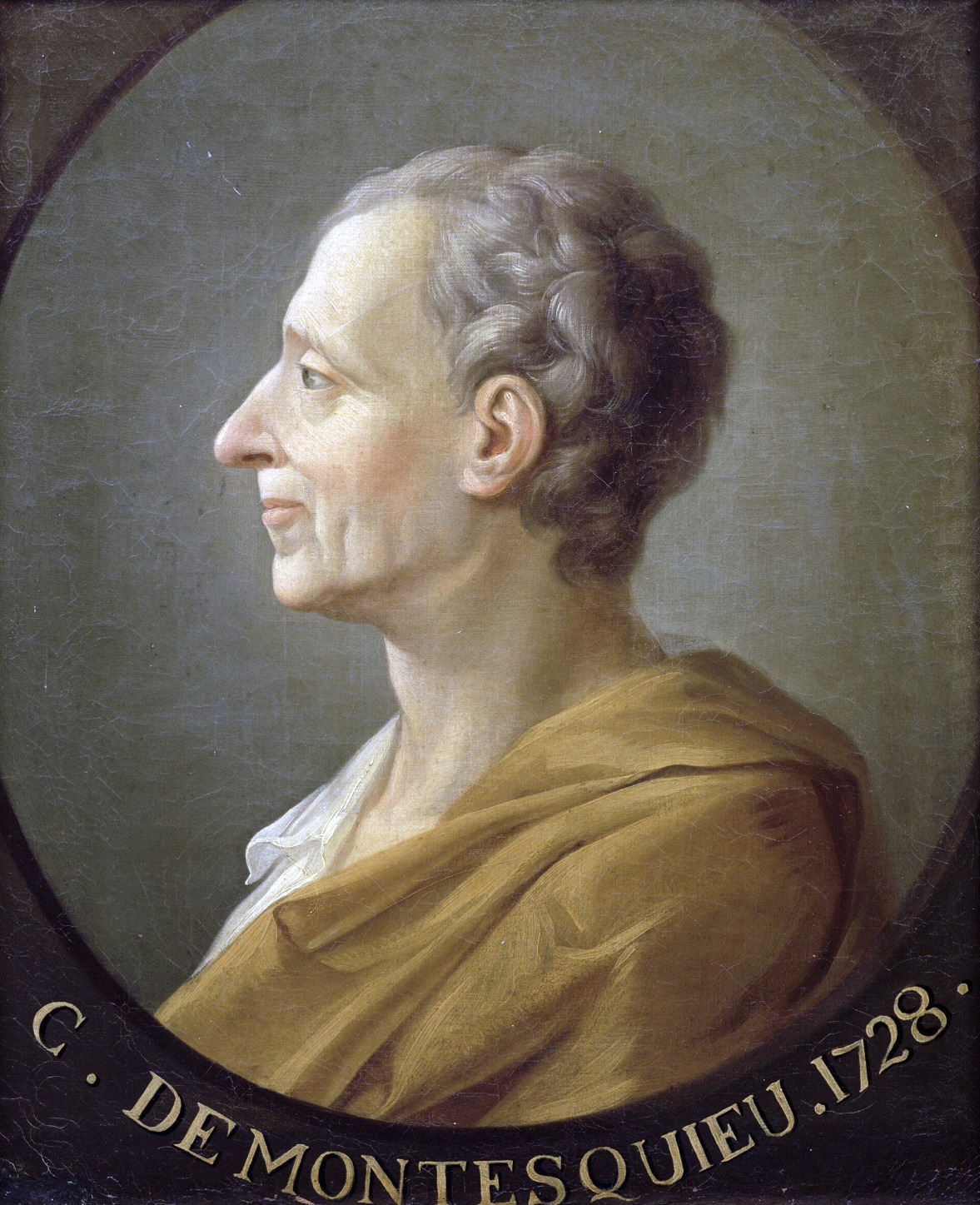
Montesquieu was a prominent figure of the French Enlightenment who argued for the separation of the powers of government in his The Spirit of the Laws (1748).

In contrast to England, the French experience in the 18th century was characterized by the perpetuation of feudalism and absolutism. Ideas that challenged the status quo were often harshly repressed. Most of the philosophers of the French Enlightenment were progressive in the liberal sense and advocated the reform of the French system of government along more constitutional and liberal lines.

Montesquieu wrote a series of highly influential works in the early 18th century, including Persian letters (1717) and The Spirit of the Laws (1748). The latter exerted tremendous influence, both inside and outside France. Montesquieu pleaded in favor of a constitutional system of government, the preservation of civil liberties and the law and the idea that political institutions ought to reflect the social and geographical aspects of each community. In particular, he argued that political liberty required the separation of the powers of government. Building on John Locke's Second Treatise of Government, he advocated that the executive, legislative and judicial functions of government should be assigned to different bodies, so that attempts by one branch of government to infringe on political liberty might be restrained by the other branches. In a lengthy discussion of the English political system, which he greatly admired, he tried to show how this might be achieved and liberty secured, even in a monarchy. He also notes that liberty cannot be secure where there is no separation of powers, even in a republic. He also emphasized the importance of a robust due process in law, including the right to a fair trial, the presumption of innocence and proportionality in the severity of punishment.

Another important figure of the French Enlightenment was Voltaire. Initially believing in the constructive role an enlightened monarch could play in improving the welfare of the people, he eventually came to a new conclusion: "It is up to us to cultivate our garden". His most polemical and ferocious attacks on intolerance and religious persecutions indeed began to appear a few years later. Despite much persecution, Voltaire remained a courageous polemicist who indefatigably fought for civil rights—the right to a fair trial and freedom of religion—and who denounced the hypocrisies and injustices of the Ancien Régime.

== Era of revolution ==
=== American Revolution ===
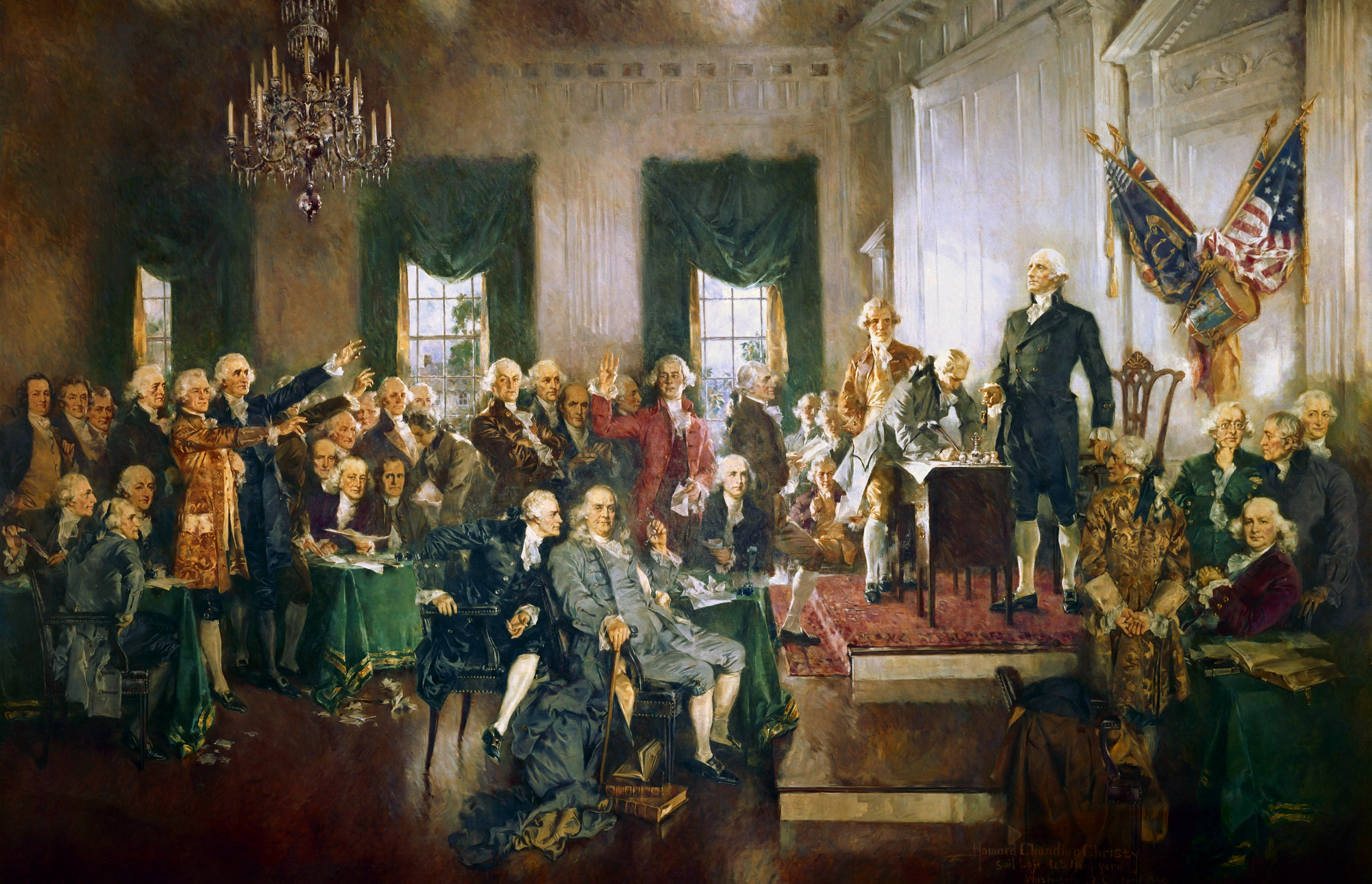
The Philadelphia Convention in 1787 adopted the United States Constitution (still in effect), which established a federalist republic with three equal branches of government.

Political tension between England and its American colonies grew after 1765 and the Seven Years' War over the issue of taxation without representation, culminating in the 1776 Declaration of Independence of a new republic, and the successful American Revolutionary War to defend the United States.

The intellectual underpinnings for independence were provided by the pamphleteer Thomas Paine. His Common Sense pro-independence pamphlet was anonymously published on January 10, 1776, and became an immediate success. It was read aloud everywhere, including the Army. He pioneered a style of political writing that rendered complex ideas easily intelligible.

The Declaration of Independence, written in committee largely by Thomas Jefferson, echoed Locke. After the war, the leaders debated about how to move forward. The Articles of Confederation, written in 1776, now appeared inadequate to provide security, or even a functional government. The Confederation Congress called a Constitutional Convention in 1787, which resulted in the writing of a new Constitution of the United States establishing a federal government. In the context of the times, the Constitution was a republican and liberal document. It remains the oldest liberal governing document in effect worldwide.

The American theorists and politicians strongly believe in the sovereignty of the people rather than in the sovereignty of the King. As one historian writes: "The American adoption of a democratic theory that all governments derive their just powers from the consent of the governed, as it had been put as early as the Declaration of Independence, was epoch-marking".

The American Revolution had its impact on the French Revolution and later movements in Europe. Leopold von Ranke, a leading German historian, in 1848 argued that American republicanism played a crucial role in the development of European liberalism:

By abandoning English constitutionalism and creating a new republic based on the rights of the individual, the North Americans introduced a new force in the world. Ideas spread most rapidly when they have found adequate concrete expression. Thus republicanism entered our Romanic/Germanic world.... Up to this point, the conviction had prevailed in Europe that monarchy best served the interests of the nation. Now the idea spread that the nation should govern itself. But only after a state had actually been formed on the basis of the theory of representation did the full significance of this idea become clear. All later revolutionary movements have this same goal.... This was the complete reversal of a principle. Until then, a king who ruled by the grace of God had been the center around which everything turned. Now the idea emerged that power should come from below.... These two principles are like two opposite poles, and it is the conflict between them that determines the course of the modern world. In Europe the conflict between them had not yet taken on concrete form; with the French Revolution it did.

=== French Revolution ===
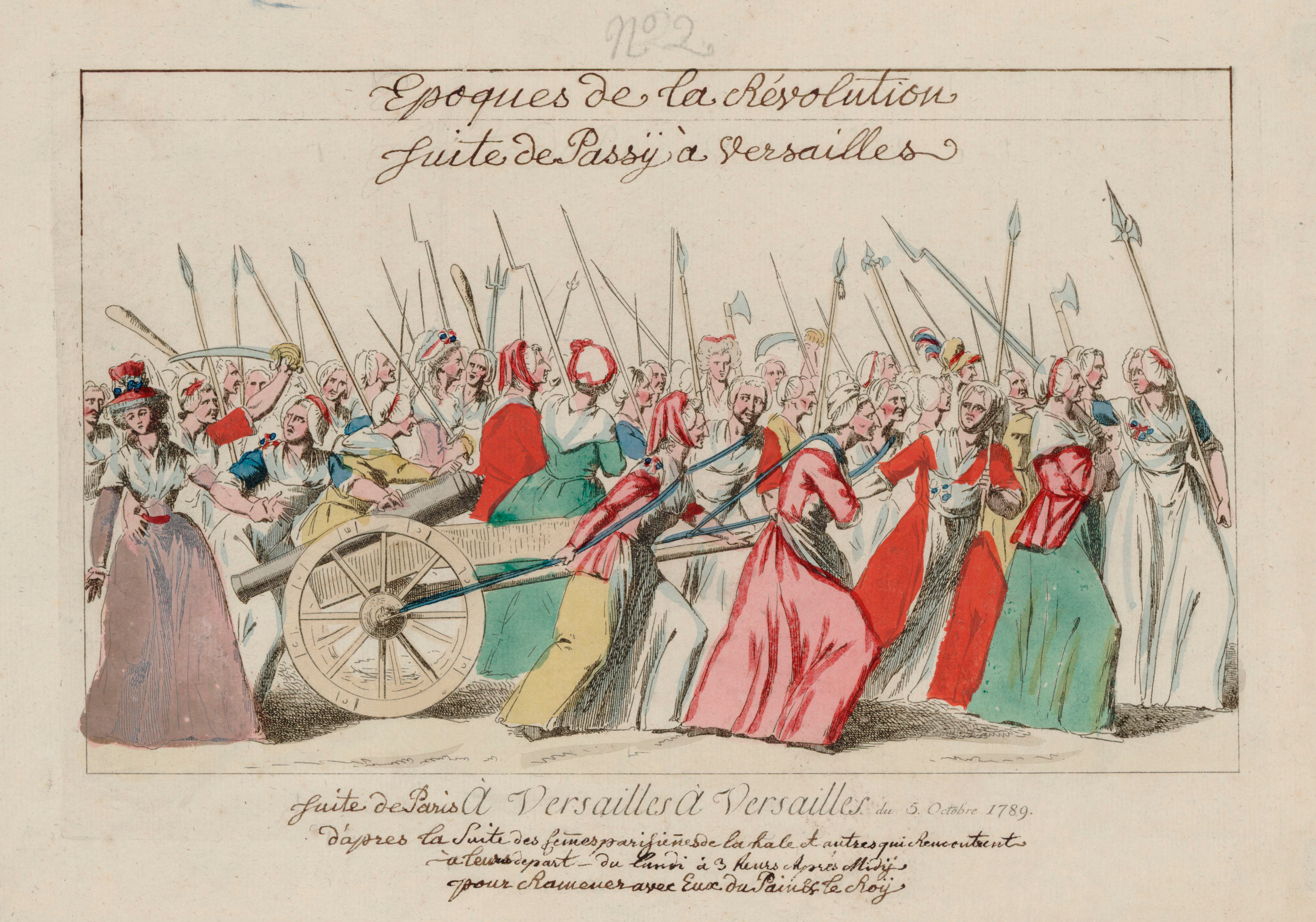
The march of the women on Versailles in October 1789, one of the most famous examples of popular political participation during the French Revolution, forced the royal court back to Paris—it would remain there until the proclamation of the First Republic in 1792.

Historians widely regard the French Revolution as one of the most important events in history. The Revolution is often seen as marking the "dawn of the modern era", and its convulsions are widely associated with "the triumph of liberalism".

Four years into the French Revolution, German writer Johann von Goethe reportedly told the defeated Prussian soldiers after the Battle of Valmy that "from this place and from this time forth commences a new era in world history, and you can all say that you were present at its birth". Describing the participatory politics of the French Revolution, one historian commented that "thousands of men and even many women gained firsthand experience in the political arena: they talked, read, and listened in new ways; they voted; they joined new organizations; and they marched for their political goals. Revolution became a tradition, and republicanism an enduring option". For liberals, the Revolution was their defining moment, and later liberals approved of the French Revolution almost entirely—"not only its results but the act itself," as two historians noted.

The French Revolution began in 1789 with the convocation of the Estates-General in May. The first year of the Revolution witnessed members of the Third Estate proclaiming the Tennis Court Oath in June, the Storming of the Bastille in July. The two key events that marked the triumph of liberalism were the Abolition of feudalism in France on the night of 4 August 1789, which marked the collapse of feudal and old traditional rights and privileges and restrictions, and the passage of the Declaration of the Rights of Man and of the Citizen in August. Jefferson, the American minister to France, was consulted in its drafting and there are striking similarities with the American Declaration of Independence.

The next few years were dominated by tensions between various liberal assemblies and a conservative monarchy intent on thwarting major reforms. A republic was proclaimed in September 1792 and King Louis XVI was executed in January 1793. However, conflict between rival political factions, the Girondins and the Jacobins, culminated in the Reign of Terror, that was marked by mass executions of "enemies of the revolution", with the death toll reaching into the tens of thousands. Finally Napoleon came to power in 1799, ended any form of democracy with his dictatorship, ended internal civil wars, made peace with the Catholic Church, and conquered much of Europe until he went too far and was finally defeated in 1815. The rise of Napoleon as dictator in 1799, heralded a reverse of many of the republican and democratic gains. However Napoleon did not restore the Ancien Régime, rather, he maintained much of the liberal reforms and imposed a liberal legal code, the Code Napoleon.

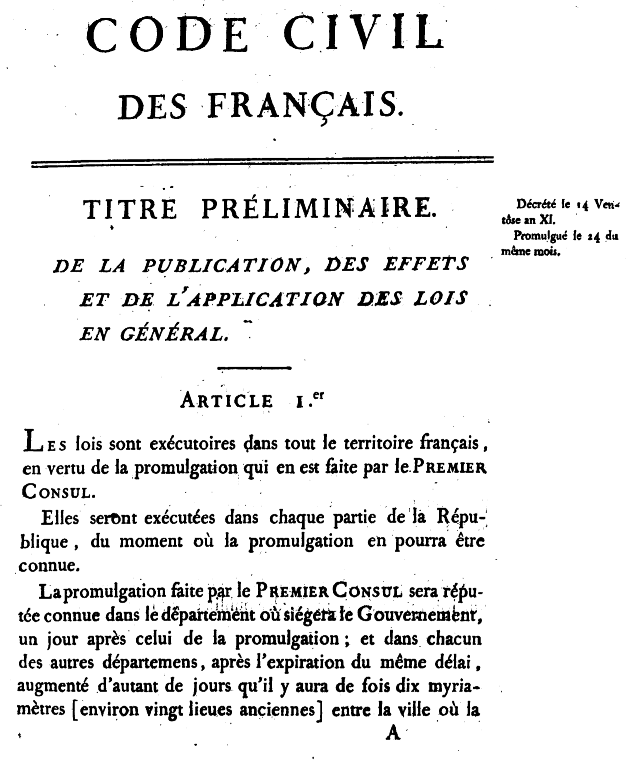
First page of Napoleon's Civil Code which removed inherited privilege and allowed freedom of religion

During the Napoleonic Wars, the French brought to Western Europe the liquidation of the feudal system, the liberalization of property laws, the end of seigneurial dues, the abolition of guilds, the legalization of divorce, the disintegration of Jewish ghettos, the collapse of the Inquisition, the final end of the Holy Roman Empire, the elimination of church courts and religious authority, the establishment of the metric system, and equality under the law for all men. Napoleon wrote that "the peoples of Germany, as of France, Italy and Spain, want equality and liberal ideas," with some historians suggesting that he may have been the first person to use the word "liberal" in a political sense. He also governed through a method that one historian described as "civilian dictatorship", which "drew its legitimacy from direct consultation with the people, in the form of a plebiscite". Napoleon, however, did not always live up to the liberal ideals he espoused.

Outside France the Revolution had a major impact and its ideas became widespread. Furthermore, the French armies in the 1790s and 1800s directly overthrew feudal remains in much of western Europe. They liberalised property laws, ended seigneurial dues, abolished the guild of merchants and craftsmen to facilitate entrepreneurship, legalised divorce, and closed the Jewish ghettos. The Inquisition ended as did the Holy Roman Empire. The power of church courts and religious authority was sharply reduced, and equality under the law was proclaimed for all men.

Artz emphasises the benefits the Italians gained from the French Revolution:

For nearly two decades the Italians had the excellent codes of law, a fair system of taxation, a better economic situation, and more religious and intellectual toleration than they had known for centuries ... Everywhere old physical, economic, and intellectual barriers had been thrown down and the Italians had begun to be aware of a common nationality.

Likewise in Switzerland the long-term impact of the French Revolution has been assessed by Martin:

It proclaimed the equality of citizens before the law, equality of languages, freedom of thought and faith; it created a Swiss citizenship, basis of our modern nationality, and the separation of powers, of which the old regime had no conception; it suppressed internal tariffs and other economic restraints; it unified weights and measures, reformed civil and penal law, authorised mixed marriages (between Catholics and Protestants), suppressed torture and improved justice; it developed education and public works.

His most lasting achievement, the Civil Code, served as "an object of emulation all over the globe," but it also perpetuated further discrimination against women under the banner of the "natural order". This unprecedented period of chaos and revolution had irreversibly introduced the world to a new movement and ideology that would soon criss-cross the globe. For France, however, the defeat of Napoleon brought about the restoration of the monarchy and an ultra-conservative order was reimposed on the country.

== Classical liberalism ==
The development into maturity of classical liberalism took place before and after the French Revolution in Britain and was based on the following core concepts, namely classical economics, free trade, laissez-faire government with minimal intervention and taxation and a balanced budget. Classical liberals were committed to individualism, liberty and equal rights. Writers such as John Bright and Richard Cobden opposed both aristocratic privilege and property, seeing them as an impediment to the development of a class of yeoman farmers.

Around 1800, classical liberals supported "the doctrines of the free market and reducing the role of the state in the economic sphere."

=== Radicalism ===
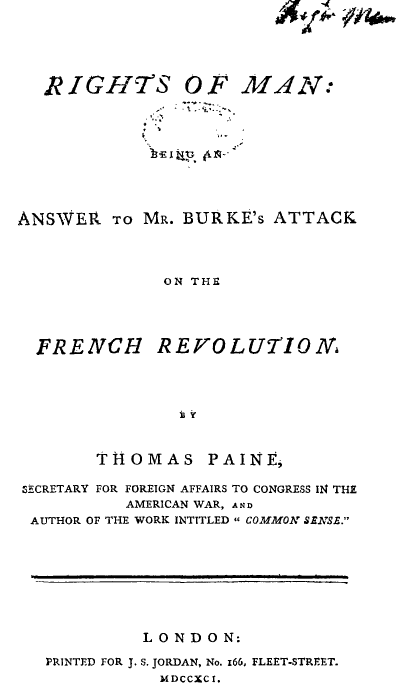
Thomas Paine's Rights of Man was a manifesto for political radicalism.

The radical liberal movement began in the 1790s in England and concentrated on parliamentary and electoral reform, emphasizing natural rights and popular sovereignty. Radicals like Richard Price and Joseph Priestley saw parliamentary reform as a first step toward dealing with their many grievances, including the treatment of Protestant Dissenters, the slave trade, high prices and high taxes.

Thomas Paine's Rights of Man (1791) provoked a response from Edmund Burke, with his conservative essay Reflections on the Revolution in France. The ensuing Revolution Controversy featured, among others, Mary Wollstonecraft, who followed with an early feminist tract A Vindication of the Rights of Woman. Radicals encouraged mass support for democratic reform along with rejection of the monarchy, aristocracy and all forms of privilege. Different strands of the movement developed, with middle-class reformers aiming to widen the franchise to represent commercial and industrial interests and towns without parliamentary representation while Popular Radicals drawn from the middle class and from artisans agitated to assert wider rights including relieving distress. The theoretical basis for electoral reform was provided by Philosophical Radicals who followed the utilitarian philosophy of Jeremy Bentham and strongly supported parliamentary reform, but were generally hostile to the arguments and tactics of the Popular Radicals.

Improved economic conditions after 1821, improvements in economic and criminal law and the abandoning of policies of repression led to decreasing polarisation and a more consensual form of reform politics that was to dominate in Britain for the next two centuries. In 1823, Jeremy Bentham co-founded the Westminster Review with James Mill as a journal for Philosophical Radicals, setting out the utilitarian philosophy.

The Reform Act 1832 was put through with the support of public outcry, mass meetings of political unions and riots in some cities. This now enfranchised the middle classes, but it failed to meet radical demands. Following the Reform Act, the mainly aristocratic Whigs in the House of Commons were joined by a small number of parliamentary Radicals as well as an increased number of middle-class Whigs. By 1839, they were informally being called the Liberal Party. The Liberals produced one of the greatest British Prime Ministers—William Ewart Gladstone, also known as the Grand Old Man, who was the towering political figure of liberalism in the 19th century. Under Gladstone, the Liberals reformed education, disestablished the Church of Ireland and introduced the secret ballot for local and parliamentary elections.

==== Laissez-faire ====
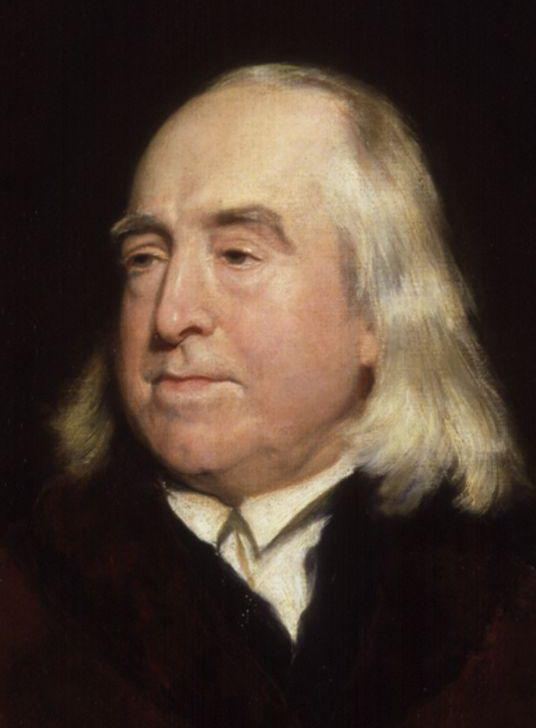
Jeremy Bentham's philosophy counseled government to adopt policies that could bestow the greatest possible social benefit.

Commitment to laissez-faire was not uniform. Some economists advocated state support of public works and education. Classical liberals were also divided on free trade. David Ricardo expressed doubt that the removal of grain tariffs would have any general benefits. Most classical liberals also supported legislation to regulate the number of hours that children were allowed to work and usually did not oppose factory reform legislation. Despite the pragmatism of classical economists, their views were expressed in dogmatic terms by such popular writers as Jane Marcet and Harriet Martineau. The strongest defender of laissez-faire was The Economist founded by James Wilson in 1843. The Economist criticised Ricardo for his lack of support for free trade and expressed hostility to welfare, believing that the lower orders were responsible for their economic circumstances. The Economist took the position that regulation of factory hours was harmful to workers and also strongly opposed state support for education, health, the provision of water and granting of patents and copyrights.

=== Liberal economic theory ===
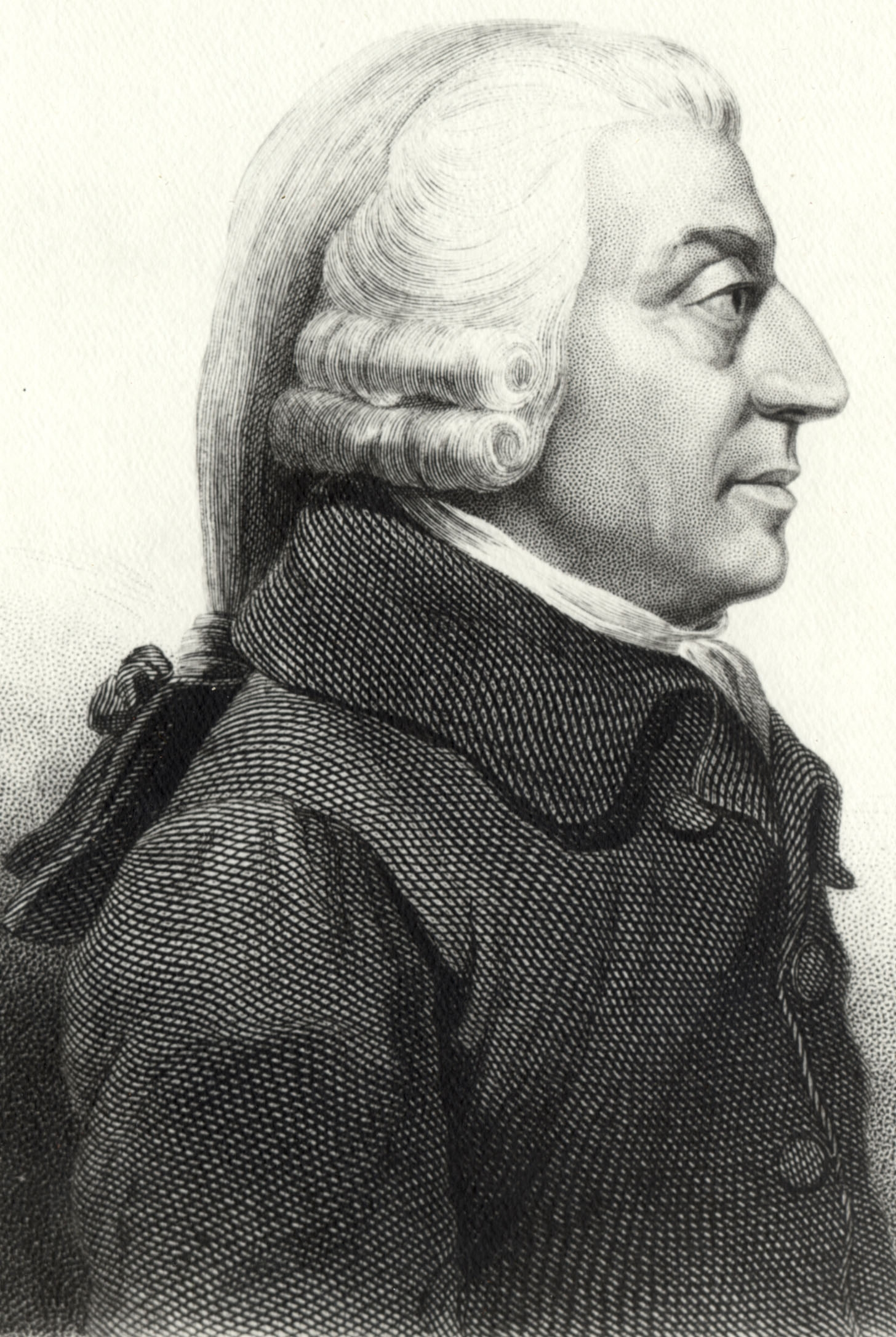
Adam Smith argued for free trade and low levels of government regulation.

The primary intellectual influences on 19th century liberal trends were those of Adam Smith and the classical economists as well as Jeremy Bentham and John Stuart Mill. Smith's The Wealth of Nations, published in 1776, was to provide most of the ideas of economics, at least until the publication of Mill's Principles in 1848. Smith addressed the motivation for economic activity, the causes of prices and the distribution of wealth as well as the policies the state should follow in order to maximise wealth. Smith's economics was carried into practice in the 19th century with the lowering of tariffs in the 1820s, the repeal of the Poor Relief Act that had restricted the mobility of labour in 1834 and the end of the rule of the East India Company over India in 1858.

In addition to Adam Smith's legacy, Say's law, Malthus theories of population and Ricardo's iron law of wages became central doctrines of classical economics. Jean Baptiste Say challenged Smith's labour theory of value, believing that prices were determined by utility and also emphasised the critical role of the entrepreneur in the economy. However, neither of those observations became accepted by British economists at the time. Thomas Malthus wrote An Essay on the Principle of Population in 1798, becoming a major influence on classical liberalism.

Utilitarianism provided the political justification for the implementation of economic liberalism by British governments which was to dominate economic policy from the 1830s. Although utilitarianism prompted legislative and administrative reform and Mill's later writings on the subject foreshadowed the welfare state, it was mainly used as a justification for laissez-faire. The central concept of utilitarianism which was developed by Jeremy Bentham was that public policy should seek to provide "the greatest happiness of the greatest number". While this could be interpreted as a justification for state action to reduce poverty, it was used by classical liberals to justify inaction with the argument that the net benefit to all individuals would be higher. His philosophy proved to be extremely influential on government policy and led to increased Benthamite attempts at government social control, including Robert Peel's Metropolitan Police, prison reforms, the workhouses and asylums for the mentally ill.

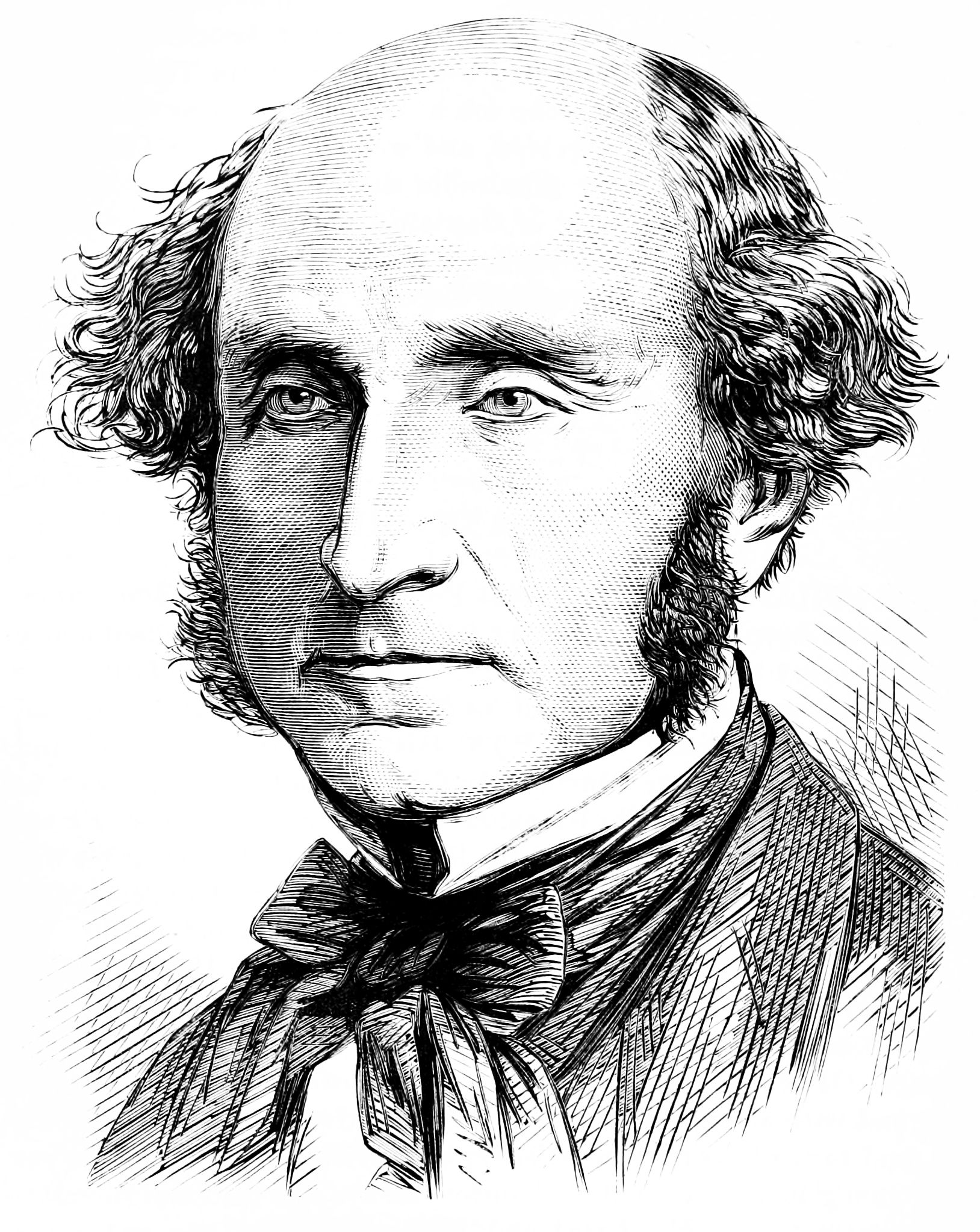
John Stuart Mill's On Liberty greatly influenced the course of 19th century liberalism.

By the end of the 19th century, the principles of classical liberalism were being increasingly challenged by downturns in economic growth, a growing perception of the evils of poverty, unemployment and relative deprivation present within modern industrial cities and the agitation of organized labour. The ideal of the self-made individual, who through hard work and talent could make his or her place in the world, seemed increasingly implausible. A major political reaction against the changes introduced by industrialisation and laissez-faire capitalism came from conservatives concerned about social balance, although socialism later became a more important force for change and reform. Some Victorian writers—including Charles Dickens, Thomas Carlyle and Matthew Arnold—became early influential critics of social injustice. The New Liberalism or social liberalism movement emerged about 1900 in Britain.

=== John Stuart Mill and liberal political theory ===
John Stuart Mill contributed enormously to liberal thought by combining elements of classical liberalism with what eventually became known as the New Liberalism. Mill's 1859 On Liberty addressed the nature and limits of the power that can be legitimately exercised by society over the individual. He gives an impassioned defence of free speech, arguing that free discourse is a necessary condition for intellectual and social progress. Mill defined social liberty as protection from "the tyranny of political rulers". He introduced a number of different concepts of the form tyranny can take, referred to as social tyranny and tyranny of the majority, respectively. Social liberty meant limits on the ruler's power through obtaining recognition of political liberties or rights and by the establishment of a system of constitutional checks.

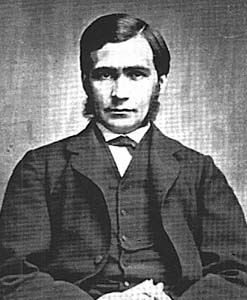
Liberal philosopher Thomas Hill Green began to espouse a more interventionist government approach.

Green's definition of liberty, influenced by Joseph Priestley and Josiah Warren, was that the individual ought to be free to do as he wishes unless he harms others. Mill was also an early proponent of feminism. In his article "The Subjection of Women" (1861, published 1869), Mill attempted to prove that the legal subjugation of women is wrong and that it should give way to perfect equality.

Although Mill's initial economic philosophy supported free markets and argued that progressive taxation penalised those who worked harder, he later altered his views toward a more socialist bent, adding chapters to his Principles of Political Economy in defence of a socialist outlook and defending some socialist causes, including the radical proposal that the whole wage system be abolished in favour of a co-operative wage system.

The Liberal Party led in Parliament by William Ewart Gladstone drew from across the intellectual and social spectrum. On one hand, there were progressive elites who sought to fuse the methods of science with liberal political economy. For example, the anthropologist and MP Sir John Lubbock followed the strategy of using cognitive science to challenge and shape public policy. Lubbock famously applied this approach to parliamentary debates relating to universal education, the preservation of monuments and the introduction of Bank Holidays. On the other hand, the Liberal Party also had a strong base in evangelical and nonconformist religious elements. At Balliol College, Oxford, Thomas Hill Green argued that the state should foster and protect the social, political and economic environments in which individuals will have the best chance of acting according to their consciences. The state should intervene only where there is a clear, proven and strong tendency of a liberty to enslave the individual. Green regarded the national state as legitimate only to the extent that it upholds a system of rights and obligations that is most likely to foster individual self-realisation. The Gladstonian liberals in 1891 adopted "the Newcastle Programme that included home rule for Ireland, disestablishment of the Church of England in Wales and Scotland, tighter controls on the sale of liquor, major extension of factory regulation and various democratic political reforms. The Programme had a strong appeal to the nonconformist middle-class Liberal element which felt liberated by the departure of the aristocratic leaders of the Liberal Party.

== Worldwide spread ==
The German savant Wilhelm von Humboldt (1767–1835) made a major contribution to the development of liberalism by envisioning education as a means of realizing individual possibility rather than a way of drilling traditional ideas into youth to suit them for an already established occupation or social role. Benjamin Constant (1767–1830), in Switzerland, refined the concept of liberty, defining it as a condition of existence that allowed the individual to turn away interference from the state or society.

Abolitionist anti-slavery and suffrage movements spread, along with representative and democratic ideals. France established an enduring republic in the 1870s. Meanwhile, nationalism also spread rapidly after 1815. A mixture of liberal and nationalist sentiment in Italy and Germany brought about the unification of the two countries in the late 19th century. A liberal regime came to power in Italy, and ended the secular power of the popes. The Vatican, however, launched a counter crusade against liberalism. Pope Pius IX issued the Syllabus of Errors in 1864, condemning liberalism in all its forms. In many countries, liberal forces responded by expelling the Jesuit order.

Social democratic ideas influenced liberalism beginning in the second half of the 19th century. This new form of liberalism was known by a variety of names across the world, including Sozial-Liberalismus in German, New Liberalism in Britain, solidarisme in France, regeneracionismo in Spain, the Giolittian Era in Italy and the Progressive Movement in the United States.

Liberalism gained momentum in the beginning of the 20th century. The bastion of autocracy, the Russian Tsar, was overthrown in the first phase of the Russian Revolution in 1917, but liberalism lasted only a matter of months before Bolshevism triumphed. The Allied victory in World War I and the collapse of four empires seemed to mark the triumph of liberalism across the European continent, including Germany and the newly created states of Eastern Europe. Militarism, as typified by Germany, was defeated and discredited. As Martin Blinkhorn argues, the liberal themes were ascendant in terms of "cultural pluralism, religious and ethnic toleration, national self-determination, free-market economics, representative and responsible government, free trade, unionism, and the peaceful settlement of international disputes through a new body, the League of Nations".

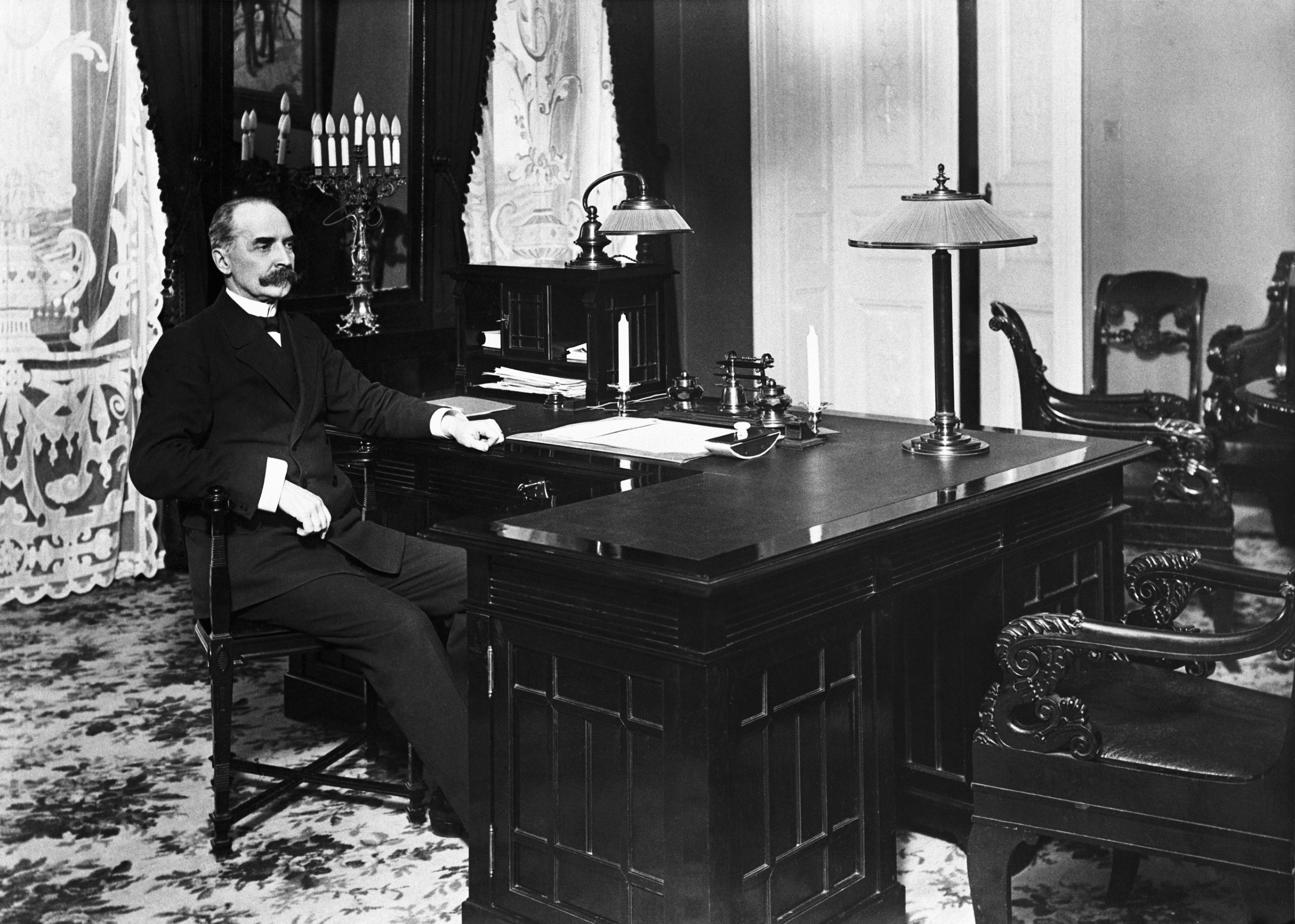
K. J. Ståhlberg (1865–1952), the first President of the Republic of Finland, defined Finland's anchoring as a country defending liberal democracy. Ståhlberg at his office in 1919.

The worldwide Great Depression, starting in 1929, hastened the discrediting of liberal economics and strengthened calls for state control over economic affairs. Economic woes prompted widespread unrest in the European political world, leading to the strengthening of fascism and communism. Their rise in 1939 culminated in World War II. The Allies, which included most of the important liberal nations as well as communist Russia, won World War II, defeating Nazi Germany, Fascist Italy, and militarist Japan. After the war, there was a falling out between Russia and the West, and the Cold War opened in 1947 between the Communist Eastern Bloc and the liberal Western Alliance.

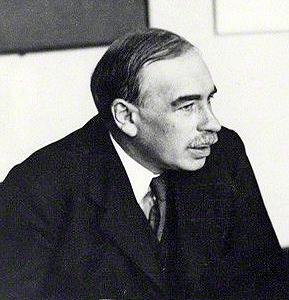
John Maynard Keynes was one of the most influential economists of modern times whose ideas, which are still widely felt, formalized modern liberal economic policy.

Meanwhile, the definitive liberal response to the Great Depression was given by the British economist John Maynard Keynes, who had begun a theoretical work examining the relationship between unemployment, money and prices back in the 1920s. Keynes was deeply critical of the British government's austerity measures during the Great Depression. He believed that budget deficits were a good thing, a product of recessions. He wrote, "For Government borrowing of one kind or another is nature's remedy, so to speak, for preventing business losses from being, in so severe a slump as to present one, so great as to bring production altogether to a standstill."

At the height of the Great Depression in 1933, Keynes published The Means to Prosperity, which contained specific policy recommendations for tackling unemployment in a global recession, chiefly counter cyclical public spending. The Means to Prosperity contains one of the first mentions of the multiplier effect. Keynes's magnum opus, The General Theory of Employment, Interest and Money was published in 1936, and served as a theoretical justification for the interventionist policies Keynes favoured for tackling a recession.

The Cold War featured extensive ideological competition and several proxy wars, but the widely feared Third World War between the Soviet Union and the United States never occurred. While communist states and liberal democracies competed against one another, an economic crisis in the 1970s inspired a move away from Keynesian economics, especially under Margaret Thatcher in the UK and Ronald Reagan in the US. This classical liberal renewal, dubbed "neoliberalism" by its supporters and detractors, lasted through the 1980s and the 1990s. Meanwhile, nearing the end of the 20th century, communist states in Eastern Europe collapsed precipitously, leaving liberal democracies as the only major forms of government in the West.

At the beginning of World War II, the number of democracies around the world was about the same as it had been forty years before. After 1945, liberal democracies spread very quickly, but then retreated. In The Spirit of Democracy, Larry Diamond argues that by 1974, "dictatorship, not democracy, was the way of the world", and that "Barely a quarter of independent states chose their governments through competitive, free, and fair elections." Diamond goes on to say that democracy bounced back and by 1995 the world was "predominantly democratic".

The gains of liberalism have been significant. In 1975, roughly 40 countries around the world were characterised as liberal democracies, but that number had increased to more than 80 as of 2008. Most of the world's richest and most powerful nations are liberal democracies with extensive social welfare programmes. However, liberalism still faces challenges, especially with the phenomenal growth of China as a model combination of authoritarian government and economic liberalism. The Great Recession, which began around 2007, prompted a resurgence in Keynesian economic thought.

A major liberal accomplishment includes the rise of liberal internationalism, which has been credited with the establishment of global organisations such as the League of Nations and, after World War II, the United Nations. The idea of exporting liberalism worldwide and constructing a harmonious and liberal internationalist order has dominated the thinking of liberals since the 18th century. "Wherever liberalism has flourished domestically, it has been accompanied by visions of liberal internationalism," one historian wrote. But resistance to liberal internationalism was deep and bitter, with critics arguing that growing global interdependency would result in the loss of national sovereignty and that democracies represented a corrupt order incapable of either domestic or global governance.

Liberalism is frequently cited as the dominant ideology of modern times. Politically, liberals have organised extensively throughout the world. Liberal parties, think tanks, and other institutions are common in many nations, although they advocate for different causes based on their ideological orientation. Liberal parties can be centre-left, centrist, or centre-right depending on their location.

Liberals are committed to build and safeguard free, fair and open societies, in which they seek to balance the fundamental values of liberty, equality and community, and in which no one is enslaved by poverty, ignorance or conformity [...] Liberalism aims to disperse power, to foster diversity and to nurture creativity.

— Liberal International

They can further be divided based on their adherence to social liberalism or classical liberalism, although all liberal parties and individuals share basic similarities, including the support for civil rights and democratic institutions. On a global level, liberals are united in the Liberal International, which contains over 100 influential liberal parties and organisations from across the ideological spectrum.

Some parties in the LI are among the most famous in the world, such as the Liberal Party of Canada, while others are among the smallest, such as the Liberal Party of Gibraltar. Regionally, liberals are organised through various institutions depending on the prevailing geopolitical context. The European Liberal Democrat and Reform Party, for example, represents the interests of liberals in Europe while the Alliance of Liberals and Democrats for Europe is the predominant liberal group in the European Parliament.

=== Freemasons ===
In long-term historical perspective, Norman Davies has argued that Freemasonry was a powerful force on behalf of Liberalism in Europe and its colonies, from about 1700 to the twentieth century. It expanded rapidly during the Age of Enlightenment, reaching practically every country in Europe, as well as the British and Spanish overseas colonies. It was especially attractive to royalty, powerful aristocrats and politicians as well as intellectuals, artists and political activists. Its great enemy was the Roman Catholic Church, so that in countries with a large Catholic element, such as France, Italy, Austria, Portugal, Spain, and Mexico, much of the ferocity of the political battles involve the confrontation between the conservatives centered around the Church and liberals who were often Freemasons.

By the 1820s, every regiment of the British Army had at least one Masonic chapter, and they set about to form chapters among civilians everywhere they were stationed in the British Empire. In the French, Spanish, and Portuguese empires, Army chapters were also active in spreading Freemasonry. In 19th and early 20th century Mexico, practically all the important leaders of liberalism were active Freemasons; they used their lodges as devices for political organization. Twentieth century totalitarian movements, especially the Fascists and Communists when they came to power, set out to systematically crush the Freemason organizations in their countries.

=== Africa and Asia ===
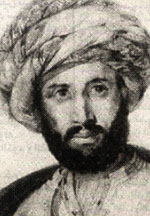
Rifa'a al-Tahtawi (1801–1873)

In the Middle East and the Ottoman Empire the effect of liberalism was significant. During the 19th century, Arab, Ottoman, and Persian intellectuals visited Europe to study and learn about Western literature, science and liberal ideas. This led them to ask themselves about their countries' underdevelopment and concluded that they needed to promote constitutionalism, development, and liberal values to modernize their societies. At the same time, the increasing European presence in the Middle East and the stagnation of the region encouraged some Middle Eastern leaders, including Mahmud II and his son Abdülmecid I, Muhammad Ali Pasha, and Amir Kabir, to make socio-political changes and start modernization projects. In 1826, intellectual and academic Rifa'a al-Tahtawi was sent to Paris in one of the Muhammad Ali's scholar missions. Tahtawi studied ethics, social and political philosophy, and mathematics. He read works by Condillac, Voltaire, Rousseau, Montesquieu and Bézout, among others, during his séjour in France.

In 1831, Tahtawi returned home to be part of the statewide effort to modernize the Egyptian infrastructure and education in what became an Egyptian renaissance (Nahda) that flourished in the late 19th and early 20th centuries, later moving to Ottoman-ruled Arabic-speaking regions including Lebanon, Syria and others. He founded the School of Languages (also known as School of Translators) in 1835, which become part of Ain Shams University in 1973. Upon his return, Al-Tahtawi became an advocate of parliamentarian, the rights of citizens to political participation, and the rights of women to education. The School of Languages graduated the earliest modern Egyptian intellectuals, who formed the basis of the emerging grassroots mobilization against British colonialism in Egypt. Three of his published volumes were works of political and moral philosophy. They introduced his Egyptian audience to the liberal ideas of the Enlightenment such as secular authority and political rights and liberty, his ideas regarding how a modern civilized society ought to be and what constituted by extension a civilized or "good Egyptian", and his ideas on public interest and public good.

In the Ottoman Empire, to secure its territorial integrity against internal nationalist movements and external aggressive powers, the Empire launched a series of reforms. This period is called Tanzimat (reorganization). Although liberal ministers and intellectuals tried to influence the reforms, the motives for the implementation of Tanzimât were bureaucratic. These changes were made to improve civil liberties. However, the reformist ideas and trends of the Nahda and Tanzimat didn't reach the common population successfully, as the books, periodicals, and newspapers were accessible primarily to intellectuals and segments of an emerging middle class, while many Muslims saw them as foreign influences on the world of Islam. That perception complicated reformist efforts made by Middle Eastern states. A policy called Ottomanism was meant to unite all the different peoples living in Ottoman territories, "Muslim and non-Muslim, Turkish and Greek, Armenian and Jewish, Kurd and Arab". The policy officially began with the Edict of Gülhane of 1839, declaring equality before the law for both Muslim and non-Muslim Ottomans.

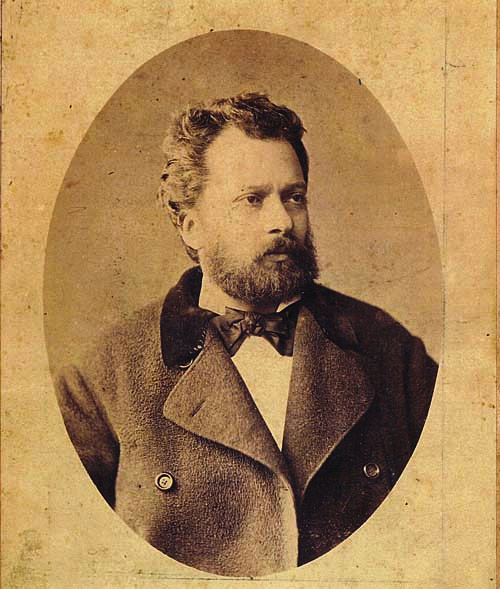
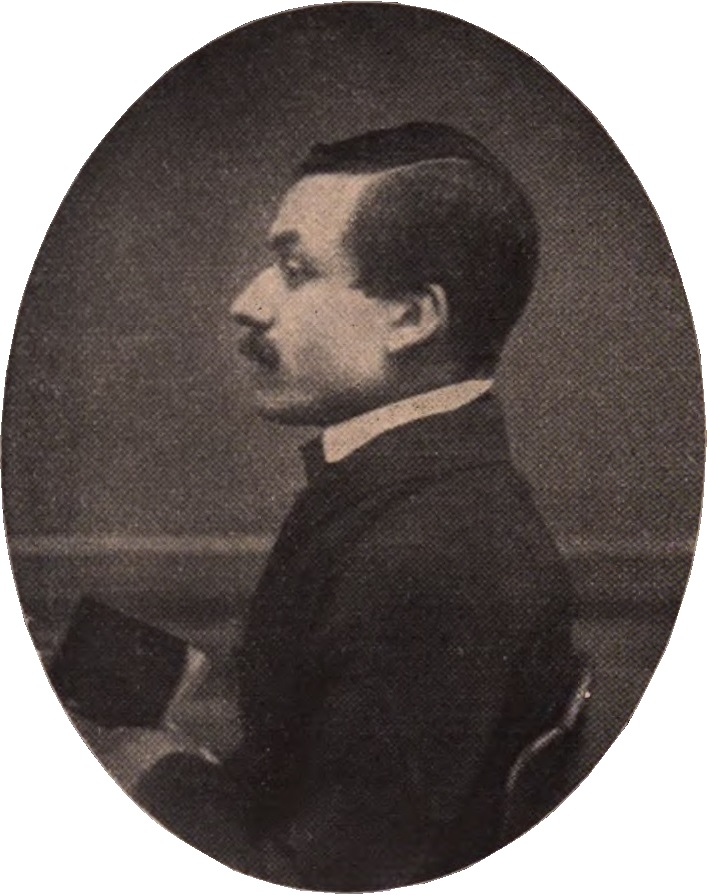
Namık Kemal (1840–1888) on the left and İbrahim Şinasi (1826–1871) on the right are two of the most prominent members of the Young Ottomans, both of whom published and printed reformist newspapers and other works in support of constitutionality and democracy in the Ottoman Empire.

In 1865, a group of Ottoman Turkish intellectuals, who were dissatisfied with the Tanzimat reforms in the Ottoman Empire, established a secret society called the Young Ottomans. They believed the reforms did not go far enough and wanted to end the autocracy in the empire. They sought to transform Ottoman society by preserving the empire and modernizing it along European lines, adopting a constitutional government. Though the Young Ottomans were frequently in disagreement ideologically, they all agreed that the new constitutional government should continue to be somewhat rooted in Islam to emphasize "the continuing and essential validity of Islam as the basis of Ottoman political culture." However, they syncretize Islamic idealism with modern liberalism and parliamentary democracy; to them the European parliamentary liberalism was a model to follow, in accordance with the tenets of Islam. They "attempted to reconcile Islamic concepts of government with the ideas of Montesquieu, Danton, Rousseau, and contemporary European Scholars and statesmen."

Namık Kemal, who was influential in the formation of the Young Ottomans, admired the constitution of the French Third Republic; he summed up the Young Ottomans' political ideals as "the sovereignty of the nation, the separation of powers, the responsibility of officials, personal freedom, equality, freedom of thought, freedom of press, freedom of association, enjoyment of property, sanctity of the home". The Young Ottomans believed that one of the principal reasons for the decline of the empire was abandoning Islamic principles in favor of imitating European modernity with unadvised compromises to both, and they sought to unite the two in a way that they believed would best serve the interests of the state and its people. They sought to revitalize the empire by incorporating certain Europeans models of government, while still retaining the Islamic foundations the empire was founded on. Among the prominent members of this society were writers and publicists such as İbrahim Şinasi, Namık Kemal, Ali Suavi, Ziya Pasha, and Agah Efendi.

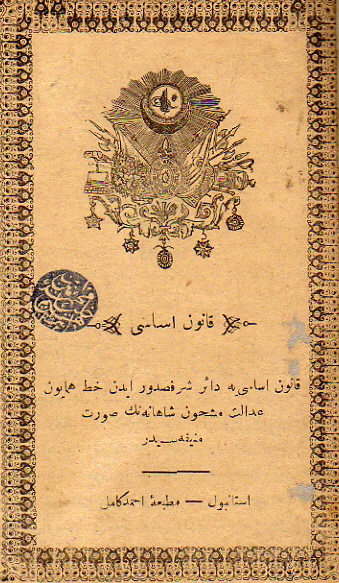
Ottoman constitution of 1876

The emerging internal financial and diplomatic crises of 1875–1876 allowed the Young Ottomans their defining moment, when Sultan Abdülhamid II appointed liberal-minded Midhat Pasha as Grand Vizier and reluctantly promulgated the Ottoman constitution of 1876, the first attempt at a constitution in the Ottoman Empire, ushering in the First Constitutional Era and ending the Tanzimat. Thanks to liberal intellectuals who tried to modernize their society by promoting development, progress, and liberal values, constitutionalism was introduced in the Ottoman Empire, Midhat Pasha is often considered to be one of the founders of the Ottoman Parliament. Although this period was short lived, with Abdülhamid ultimately suspending the constitution and parliament in 1878 in favor of a return to absolute monarchy with himself in power, the legacy and influence of the Young Ottomans continued to endure until the collapse of the empire. Several decades later, another group of reform-minded Ottomans, the Young Turks, repeated the Young Ottomans' efforts, leading to the Young Turk Revolution in 1908 and the beginning of the Second Constitutional Era.

The Nahda period sought to modernize Islam and society. Thinkers and religious reformers rejected traditional views and encourage modernization through the abandonment of taqlid (imitation, conformity to legal precedent) and emphasis on ijtihad (intellectual effort, reasoning and hermeneutics), which they saw as a return to Islamic origins. The Islamic Modernist movement, also sometimes referred to as Modernist Salafism, has been described as "the first Muslim ideological response to the Western cultural challenge" (Note: "Islamic modernism was the first Muslim ideological response to the Western cultural challenge. Started in India and Egypt in the second part of the 19th century ... reflected in the work of a group of like-minded Muslim scholars, featuring a critical reexamination of the classical conceptions and methods of jurisprudence and a formulation of a new approach to Islamic theology and Quranic exegesis.") Islamic modernism was the first of several movements—including secularism, Islamism and Salafism—that emerged in the middle of the 19th century in reaction to the rapid changes of the time, especially the perceived onslaught of Western Civilization and colonialism on the Muslim world. The founders of Islamic modernism include Muhammad Abduh, a Sheikh of Al-Azhar University for a brief period before his death in 1905, Jamal ad-Din al-Afghani, and Muhammad Rashid Rida (d. 1935). The movement started with Rifa'a al-Tahtawi but gained popularity when al-Afghani organized a group of Muslim scholars to discuss the socio-political and theological challenges that Islam was facing. The movement attempted to reconcile Islamic faith with modern Western values such as nationalism, democracy, civil rights, rationality, equality, and progress. It featured a "critical reexamination of the classical conceptions and methods of jurisprudence" and a new approach to Islamic theology and Quranic exegesis (Tafsir). Islamic modernism and liberal nationalism were interconnected, both were factors in the retreat of Islamic orthodoxy and the decline of the absolutist state. Although Middle Eastern liberal nationalism took Western liberalism as inspiration, favoring national integration via cultural and educational reforms, the promotion of indigenous national languages, and the separation of religion and politics, concepts of nationalism, and the principles of democratic institutions. It was a response to colonialism and interventionism and collided with Western interests in the region. In Egypt, Islamic modernism let liberal nationals reach a wider audience. This ended in the 1920s and 1930s when liberal nationalism took a strong secularist orientation, weakening Islamic modernism. All these changes in the Muslim world created a sense of crisis within Islam that favored Islamic revivalism.

In 1909, in Qajari ruled Persia (today Iran) the Democrat Party (also translated as Democratic Party) during the constitutional period, was one of two major parliamentary parties at the time, alongside its rival the Moderate Socialists Party. Initially an offshoot of the Transcaucasia-based Social Democratic Party, it was largely composed of liberal middle-class intellectuals and stood for a representative political system and the separation of church and state, to limit the authority of the monarchy and the clergy. It influenced the Constitution of 1906 which created the Majlis (parliament) and the senate. However, due internal and external factors, the party couldn't grow significantly and was suppressed and when the Pahlavi Dynasty was established in 1925, fragmenting itself into different smaller associations.

In Japan, which was generally liberal in the 1920s, saw liberalism wither away in the 1930s under pressure from the military.

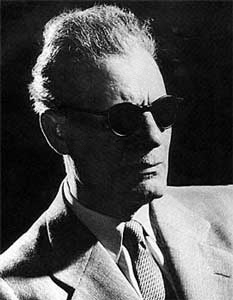
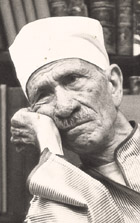
Taha Hussein (1889–1973) on the left and Ahmed Lutfi el-Sayed (1872–1963) on the right

In Egypt, the Wafd Party ("Delegation Party") was a nationalist liberal political party in Egypt. It was said to be Egypt's most popular and influential political party for a period in the 1920s and 30s. Although the efforts of liberal nationalists culminated in the formation of a constitutional monarchy with the Egyptian Constitution of 1923, liberal nationalism declined in the late 1930s due to the growth and opposition of two movements, the Muslim Brotherhood and Pan-Arab nationalism. However, there were various examples of intellectuals who advocated liberal values and ideas. Prominent liberals during the period were Taha Hussein, Ahmed Lutfi el-Sayed, Tawfiq al-Hakim, Abd El-Razzak El-Sanhuri, Abd El-Razzak El-Sanhuri and Muhammad Mandur.

Taha Hussein and Ahmed Lutfi el-Sayed were among the most influential 20th-century Egyptian intellectuals. Hussein was opposed to Islamism and one of his major contributions to the liberal movement was an examination of how Egyptian liberalism and Islam could be reconciled. He believed in freedom and equality and that Egypt should be developed as a modern, enlightened society in line with the ideas of the French Revolution and the Industrial Age.

El-Sayed was one of the architects of modern Egyptian nationalism, secularism, and liberalism. Fondly known as the "Professor of the Generation", he was an influential person in the Egyptian nationalist movement and an anti-colonial activist. el-Sayed believed in equality and rights for all people. He was the first director of Cairo University, in which he served from 1925 to 1941. He was considered one of the first Egyptian officials to introduce Mill's works to the general Arab public, so they could educate themselves on concepts of liberalism. He believed that people should have a say in what goes on in their government and country, and that all people had certain civil rights that could not be taken away.

In 1949, the National Front of Iran was founded by Mohammad Mosaddegh, Hossein Fatemi, Ahmad Zirakzadeh, Ali Shayegan and Karim Sanjabi among others. It is the oldest pro-democracy group operating inside Iran. The front was conceived to be a broad alliance of like-minded associations, included various, nationalist, liberal, and social democratic parties, with the aim of strengthening democracy, press freedom, and constitutional government. The most important groups in the Front were the Iran Party, the Toilers Party, the National Party, and the Tehran Association of Bazaar Trade and Craft Guilds. The Iran Party, which was founded in 1946 as a platform for Iranian liberals, included figures such as Karim Sanjâbi, Gholam Hossein Sadighi, Ahmad Zirakzadeh and Allah-Yar Saleh.

In April 1951, The National Front became the governing coalition when democratically elected Mohammad Mosaddegh took office as the Prime Minister of Iran. Mosaddegh was liberal nationalist and prominent parliamentarian who advocated for the rule of law and freedom of foreign intervention, his administration introduced a range of progressive social and political reforms such as social security and land reforms, including taxation of the rent on land. His government's most notable policy, however, was the nationalization of the Iranian oil industry, which had been under British control since 1913 through the Anglo-Persian Oil Company (APOC/AIOC) (later British Petroleum and BP), becoming the first country in the Middle East in nationalize its oil industry.

Mossadegh's liberal and independent way of governing gained him the popular support but also alienated various groups. It entered in direct conflict with the Western interests in the region, challenged the shah's authority and Mossadegh's tolerance with lefties groups offended the traditionalist and the ulama. In favour of strengthening the monarchical rule of Mohammad Reza Pahlavi, Winston Churchill and the Eisenhower administration decided to overthrow Iran's government, though the predecessor Truman administration had opposed a coup. Mosaddegh was removed from power in a coup on 19 August 1953, organised and carried out by the CIA at the request of MI6, which chose Iranian General Fazlollah Zahedi to succeed Mosaddegh.

The 1953 coup ended the dominance of liberalism in the country's government. Before 1953 and throughout the 1960s, the National Front was torn by strife between secular and religious elements and over the time has splintered into various squabbling factions, gradually emerging as the leading organization of secular liberals with nationalist members adhering to liberal democracy and social democracy.

In the middle of the 20th century, the Liberal Party and the Progressive Party were formed to oppose the apartheid policies of the government. The Liberals formed a multiracial party that originally drew considerable support from urban Blacks and college-educated Whites. It also gained supporters from the "westernised sectors of the peasantry", and its public meetings were heavily attended by Blacks. The party had 7,000 members at its height, although its appeal to the White population as a whole was too small to make any meaningful political changes. The Liberals were disbanded in 1968 after the government passed a law that prohibited parties from having multiracial membership.

In India, the INC was founded in the late 19th century by liberal nationalists demanding the creation of a more liberal and autonomous India. Liberalism continued to be the main ideological current of the group through the early years of the 20th century, but socialism gradually overshadowed the thinking of the party in the next few decades.

A famous struggle led by the INC eventually earned India's independence from Britain. In recent times, the party has adopted more of a liberal streak, championing open markets while simultaneously seeking social justice. In its 2009 Manifesto, the INC praised a "secular and liberal" Indian nationalism against the nativist, communal, and conservative ideological tendencies it claims are espoused by the right. In general, the major theme of Asian liberalism in the past few decades has been the rise of democratization as a method facilitate the rapid economic modernization of the continent. In nations such as Myanmar, however, liberal democracy has been replaced by military dictatorship.

Among African nations, South Africa stands out for having a notable liberal tradition that other countries on the continent lack. Today, liberalism in South Africa is represented by the Democratic Alliance, the official opposition party to the ruling African National Congress. The Democratic Alliance is the second largest party in the National Assembly and currently leads the provincial government of Western Cape.

Recently, liberal parties and institutions have made a major push for political power. On a continental level, liberals are organised in the Africa Liberal Network, which contains influential parties such as the Popular Movement in Morocco, the Democratic Party in Senegal, and the Rally of the Republicans in Côte d'Ivoire. In Asia, several Asian nations have explicitly rejected important liberal principles. Continentally, liberals are organized through the Council of Asian Liberals and Democrats, which includes powerful parties such the Liberal Party in the Philippines, the Democratic Progressive Party in Taiwan, and the Democrat Party in Thailand. A notable example of liberal influence can be found in India. In India, the most populous democracy in the world, the Indian National Congress has long dominated political affairs.

=== Americas ===
In Latin America, liberal unrest dates back to the 18th century, when liberal agitation in Latin America led to independence from the imperial power of Spain and Portugal. The new regimes were generally liberal in their political outlook, and employed the philosophy of positivism, which emphasized the truth of modern science, to buttress their positions.

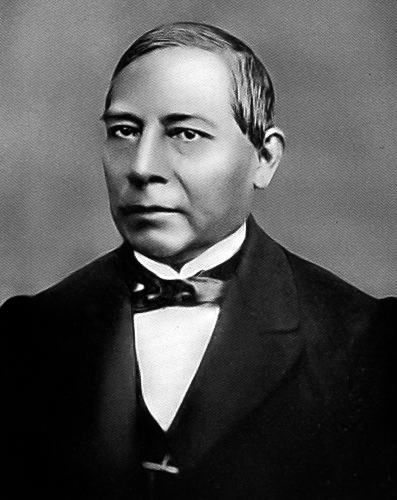
Benito Juárez, 26th President of Mexico

The liberal and conservative struggles in Spain also replicated themselves in Latin America. Like its former master, the region was a hotbed of wars, conflicts, and revolutionary activity throughout the 19th century. In Mexico, the liberales instituted the program of La Reforma in the 1850s, reducing the power of the military and the Catholic Church. The conservadores were outraged at these steps and launched a revolt, which sparked a deadly conflict. From 1857 to 1861, Mexico was gripped in the bloody War of Reform, a massive internal and ideological confrontation between the liberals and the conservatives. The liberals eventually triumphed and Benito Juárez, a dedicated liberal and now a Mexican national hero, became the president of the republic. After Juárez, Mexico suffered from prolonged periods of dictatorial repression, which lasted until the Mexican Revolution in the early 20th century.

Another regional example of liberal influence can be found in Ecuador. As with other nations throughout the region at the time, Ecuador was steeped in conflict and uncertainty after gaining independence from Spain. By the middle of the 19th century, the country had descended into chaos and madness, with the people divided between rival liberal and conservative camps. From these conflicts, García Moreno established a conservative government that ruled the country for several years. The liberals, however, were incensed at the conservative regime and overthrew it completely in the Liberal Revolution of 1895. The Radical Liberals who toppled the conservatives were led by Eloy Alfaro, a firebrand who implemented a variety of sociopolitical reforms, including the separation of church and state, the legalization of divorce, and the establishment of public schools.

Liberal revolutions in countries such as Mexico and Ecuador ushered in the modern world for much of Latin America. Latin American liberals generally emphasised free trade, private property, and anti-clericalism.

In the United States, a vicious war ensured the integrity of the nation and the abolition of slavery in the south. Historian Don Doyle has argued that the Union victory in the American Civil War (1861–65) gave a major boost to the course of liberalism. The Union victory energized popular democratic forces. A Confederate victory, on the other hand, would have meant a new birth of slavery, not freedom. Historian Fergus Bordewich, following Doyle, argues that:

The North's victory decisively proved the durability of democratic government. Confederate independence, on the other hand, would have established An American model for reactionary politics and race-based repression that would likely have cast an international shadow into the twentieth century and perhaps beyond."

In Canada, the long-dominant Liberal Party, founded in 1867 and occasionally known as the Grits, ruled the country for nearly 70 years during the 20th century. The party produced some of the most influential prime ministers in Canadian history, including Pierre Trudeau, Lester B. Pearson and Jean Chrétien, and has been primarily responsible for the development of the Canadian welfare state. The enormous success of the Liberals—virtually unmatched in any other liberal democracy—has prompted many political commentators over time to identify them as the nation's natural governing party.

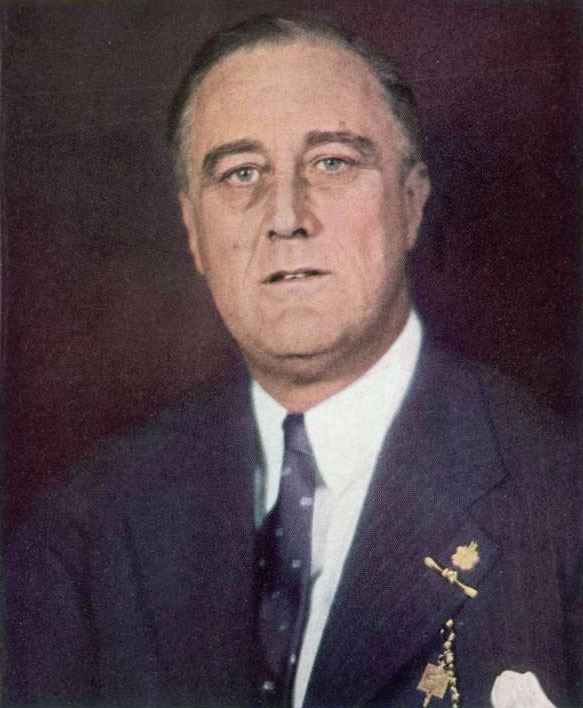
Color photo of Franklin D. Roosevelt as the Man of the Year of Time, January 1933

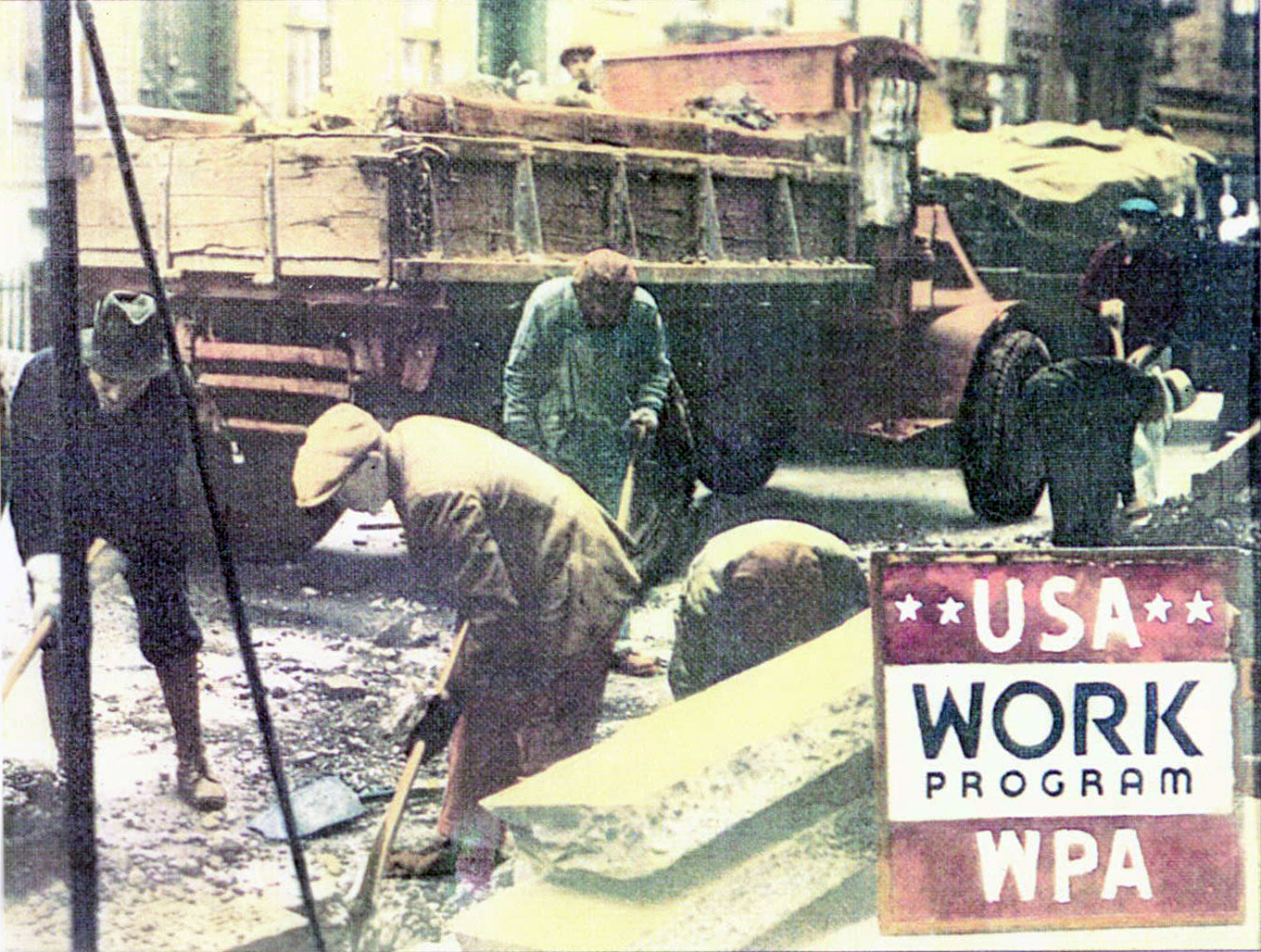
Unskilled labourers working for the Works Progress Administration, a New Deal agency

In the United States, modern liberalism traces its history to the popular presidency of Franklin Delano Roosevelt, who initiated the New Deal in response to the Great Depression and won an unprecedented four elections. The New Deal coalition established by Franklin Roosevelt left a decisive legacy and influenced many future American presidents, including John F. Kennedy, a self-described liberal who defined a liberal as "someone who looks ahead and not behind, someone who welcomes new ideas without rigid reactions ... someone who cares about the welfare of the people". The social liberal program launched by President Roosevelt in the United States, the New Deal, proved very popular with the American public. In 1933, when FDR came into office, the unemployment rate stood at roughly 25 percent. The size of the economy, measured by the gross national product, had fallen to half the value it had in early 1929. The electoral victories of FDR and the Democrats precipitated a deluge of deficit spending and public works programs. In 1940, the level of unemployment had fallen by 10 points to around 15 percent. Additional state spending and the gigantic public works program sparked by the Second World War eventually pulled the United States out of the Great Depression. The social liberal programme reduced the unemployment rate from roughly 25 percent to about 15 percent by 1940. Additional state spending and the very large public works programme sparked by the Second World War eventually pulled the United States out of the Great Depression. From 1940 to 1941, government spending increased by 59 percent, the gross domestic product increased 17 percent, and unemployment fell below 10 percent for the first time since 1929.

Among the various regional and national movements, the civil rights movement in the United States during the 1960s strongly highlighted the liberal efforts for equal rights. The Great Society project launched by President Lyndon B. Johnson oversaw the creation of Medicare and Medicaid, the establishment of Head Start and the Job Corps as part of the War on Poverty, and the passage of the landmark Civil Rights Act of 1964—an altogether rapid series of events that some historians have dubbed the Liberal Hour.

In the 1960s and 1970s, the cause of Second Wave feminism in the United States was advanced in large part by liberal feminist organisations such as the National Organization for Women.

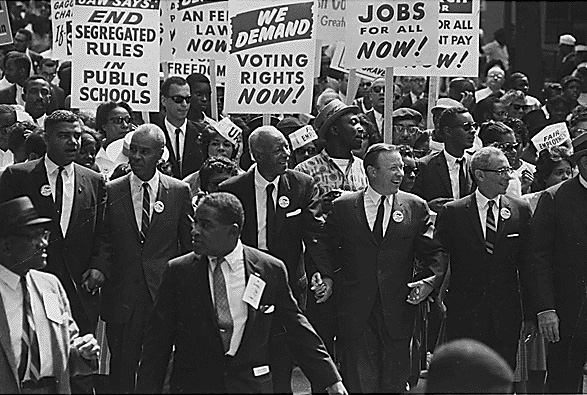
The March on Washington participants and leaders

In the late 20th century, a conservative backlash against the kind of liberalism championed by Roosevelt and Kennedy developed in the Republican Party. This brand of conservatism primarily reacted against the cultural and political upheavals of the 1960s. It helped launch into power such presidents as Ronald Reagan, George H. W. Bush, George W. Bush, and Donald Trump. The 2008 financial crisis led to a resurgence of social liberalism with the election of Barack Obama in the 2008 United States presidential election, along with countervailing and partly reactive conservative populism and nativism embodied in the Tea Party movement and the election of Donald Trump.

Today, market liberals in Latin America are organised in the Red Liberal de América Latina (RELIAL), a centre-right network that brings together dozens of liberal parties and organisations. RELIAL features parties as geographically diverse as the Mexican Nueva Alianza and the Cuban Liberal Union, which aims to secure power in Cuba. Some major liberal parties in the region continue, however, to align themselves with social liberal ideas and policies—a notable case being the Colombian Liberal Party, which is a member of the Socialist International. Another famous example is the Paraguayan Authentic Radical Liberal Party, one of the most powerful parties in the country, which has also been classified as centre-left.

=== Europe ===
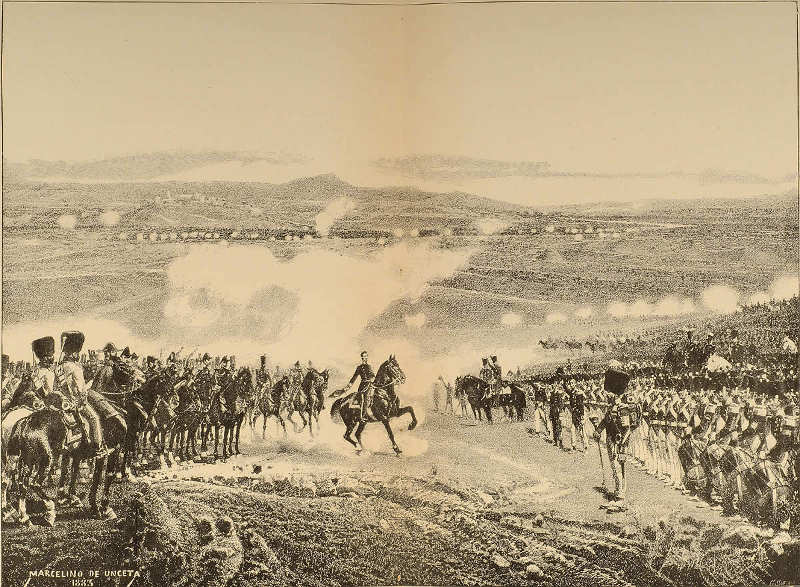
The Spanish Liberals prepare to attack the Carlists in the Battle of Mendigorría (1835).

The iconic painting Liberty Leading the People by Eugène Delacroix, a tableau of the July Revolution in 1830

In Spain, the Liberales, the first group to use the liberal label in a political context, fought for the implementation of the 1812 Constitution for decades—overthrowing the monarchy in 1820 as part of the Trienio Liberal and defeating the conservative Carlists in the 1830s.

In France, the fall of Napoleon in 1814–15 brought back to power in France the reactionary Bourbon kings. However even they were unable to reverse the liberalization of the French Revolution and they were overthrown in 1830. Likewise, the fall of Napoleon had brought conservatives to power across much of Europe. The July Revolution of 1830, orchestrated by liberal politicians and journalists, removed the Bourbon monarchy and inspired similar uprisings elsewhere in Europe. Frustration with the pace of political progress in the early 19th century sparked even more gigantic revolutions in 1848. Revolutions spread throughout the Austrian Empire, the German states, and the Italian states. Governments fell rapidly. Liberal nationalists demanded written constitutions, representative assemblies, greater suffrage rights, and freedom of the press. A second republic was proclaimed in France. Serfdom was abolished in Prussia, Galicia, Bohemia, and Hungary. The indomitable Metternich, the Austrian builder of the reigning conservative order, shocked Europe when he resigned and fled to Britain in panic and disguise.

Eventually, however, the success of the revolutionaries petered out. Without French help, the Italians were easily defeated by the Austrians. With some luck and skill, Austria also managed to contain the bubbling nationalist sentiments in Germany and Hungary, helped along by the failure of the Frankfurt Assembly to unify the German states into a single nation. Two decades later, however, the Italians and the Germans realised their dreams for unification and independence. The Sardinian Prime Minister, Camillo di Cavour, was a shrewd liberal who understood that the only effective way for the Italians to gain independence was if the French were on their side. Napoleon III agreed to Cavour's request for assistance and France defeated Austria in the Franco-Austrian War of 1859, setting the stage for Italian independence. German unification transpired under the leadership of Otto von Bismarck, who decimated the enemies of Prussia in war after war, finally triumphing against France in 1871 and proclaiming the German Empire in the Hall of Mirrors at Versailles, ending another saga in the drive for nationalisation. The French proclaimed a third republic after their loss in the war.

In Germany, unification brought to power the leading conservative of the nineteenth century, Otto von Bismarck, a member of the landholding Junker aristocracy. In order to secure the loyalty of the working classes to the ruling aristocracy, Bismarck introduced both universal male suffrage and the first welfare state. Bismarck first formed a coalition with the liberals, with a focus on ending trade restrictions and reducing the power of the Catholic Church. By the late 1870s he then reversed positions, and began collaborating with Catholics. He's best known for a foreign-policy that balanced multiple competing interests to produce a peaceful era.

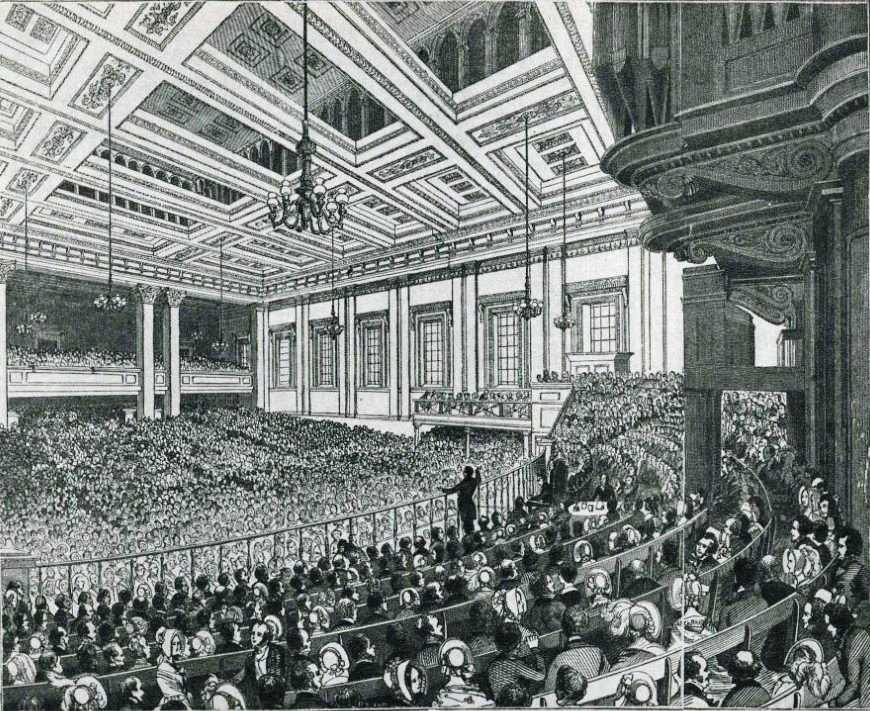
A meeting of the Anti-Corn Law League in Exeter Hall in 1846

In the United Kingdom, the repeal of the Corn Laws in 1846 was a watershed moment and encapsulated the triumph of free trade and liberal economics. The Anti-Corn Law League brought together a coalition of liberal and radical groups in support of free trade under the leadership of Richard Cobden and John Bright, who opposed militarism and public expenditure. Their policies of low public expenditure and low taxation were later adopted by the liberal chancellor of the exchequer and later prime minister, William Ewart Gladstone. Although classical liberals aspired to a minimum of state activity, they eventually accepted the principle of government intervention in the economy from the early 19th century with the passage of the Factory Acts. From around 1840 to 1860, laissez-faire advocates of the Manchester School and writers in The Economist were confident that their early victories would lead to a period of expanding economic and personal liberty and world peace but would face reversals as government intervention and activity continued to expand from the 1850s. Jeremy Bentham and James Mill, although advocates of laissez-faire, non-intervention in foreign affairs, and individual liberty, believed that social institutions could be rationally redesigned through the principles of Utilitarianism. By the 1870s, Herbert Spencer and other classical liberals concluded that historical development was turning against them. By the First World War, the Liberal Party had largely abandoned classical liberal principles.

The Liberals, under Henry Campbell-Bannerman and later H.H. Asquith, returned with full strength in the general election of 1906, aided by working class voters worried about food prices. After that historic victory, the Liberal Party introduced various reforms, including health insurance, unemployment insurance, and pensions for elderly workers, thereby laying the groundwork for the future British welfare state.

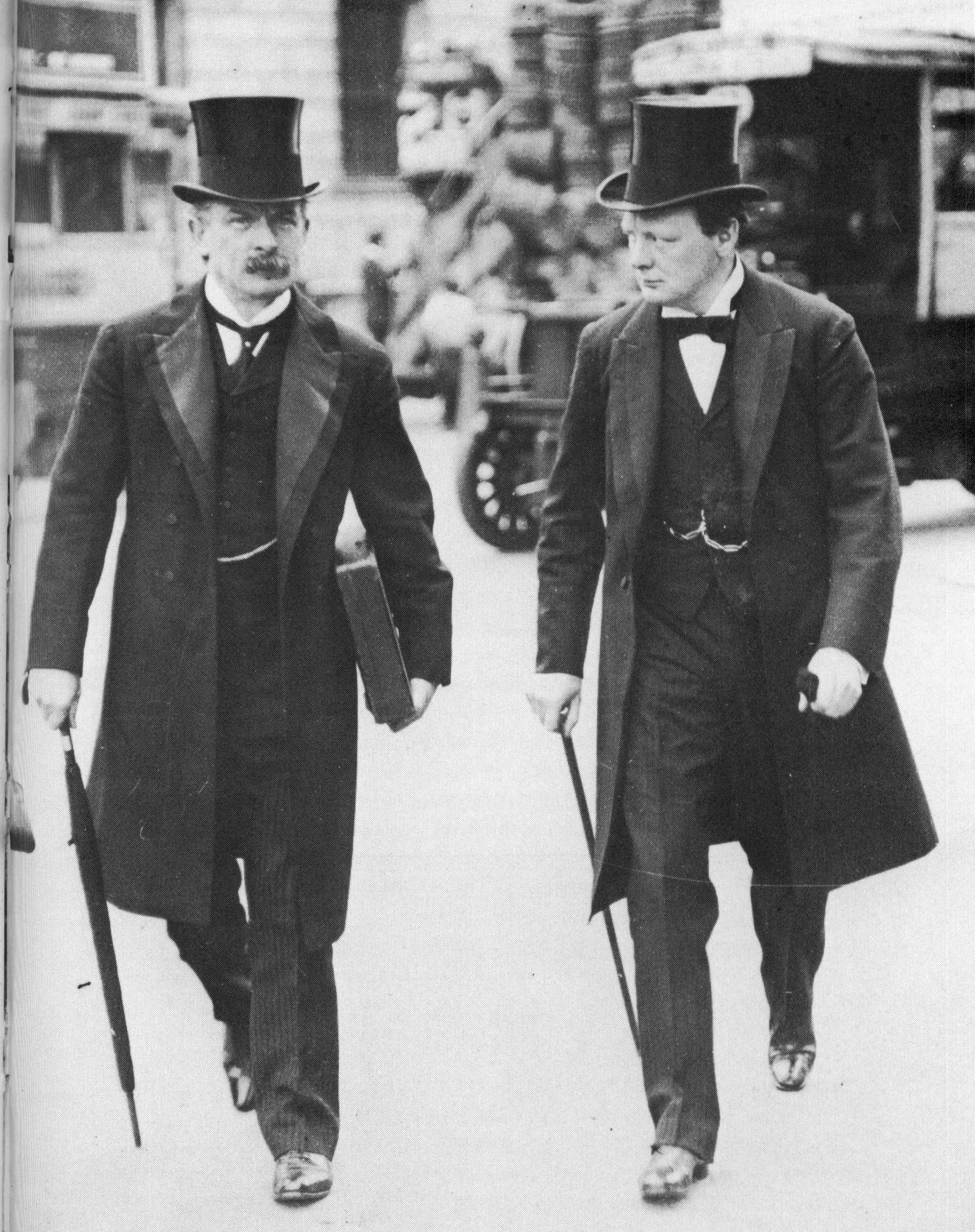
Liberal politicians David Lloyd George and Winston Churchill enacted the 1909 People's Budget which specifically aimed at the redistribution of wealth.

The People's Budget of 1909, championed by David Lloyd George and fellow liberal Winston Churchill, introduced unprecedented taxes on the wealthy in Britain and radical social welfare programmes to the country's policies. It was the first budget with the expressed intent of redistributing wealth among the public. It imposed increased taxes on luxuries, liquor, tobacco, incomes, and land—taxation that disproportionately affected the rich—so that money could be made available for new welfare programmes as well as new battleships. In 1911 Lloyd George succeeded in putting through Parliament his National Insurance Act, making provision for sickness and invalidism, and this was followed by his Unemployment Insurance Act.

Historian Peter Weiler argues the following:

Although still partially informed by older Liberal concerns for character, self-reliance, and the capitalist market, this legislation nevertheless, marked a significant shift in Liberal approaches to the state and social reform, approaches that later governments would slowly expand and that would grow into the welfare state after the Second World War. What was new in these reforms was the underlying assumption that the state could be a positive force, that the measure of individual freedom [...] was not how much the state left people alone, but whether he gave them the capacity to fill themselves as individuals.

At the turn of the 20th century, the incompetence of the ruling class in Russia discredited the monarchy and aristocracy. Russia was already reeling from earlier losses to Japan and political struggles with the Kadets, a powerful liberal bloc in the Duma. Facing huge shortages in basic necessities along with widespread riots in early 1917, Czar Nicholas II abdicated in March, bringing to an end three centuries of Romanov rule and paving the way for liberals to declare a republic. Russia's liberals, repeatedly used the slogans, symbols and ideas of the French Revolution—plastering liberté, égalité, fraternité over major public spaces—to establish an emotional attachment to the past, an attachment that liberals hoped would galvanize the public to fight for modern values.

But democracy was no simple task, and the Provisional Government that took over the country's administration needed the cooperation of the Petrograd Soviet, an organization that united leftist industrial laborers, to function and survive. Under the uncertain leadership of Alexander Kerensky, however, the Provisional Government mismanaged Russia's continuing involvement in the war, prompting angry reactions from the Petrograd workers, who drifted further and further to the left. The Bolsheviks, a communist group led by Vladimir Lenin, seized the political opportunity from this confusion and launched a second revolution in Russia during the same year. The communists violently overthrew the fragile liberal-socialist order in October, after which Russia witnessed several years of civil war between communists and conservatives wishing to restore the monarchy.

The worldwide Great Depression, starting in 1929, hastened the discrediting of liberal economics and strengthened calls for state control over economic affairs. Economic woes prompted widespread unrest in the European political world, leading to the rise of fascism as an ideology and a movement arrayed against both liberalism and communism, especially in Nazi Germany and Italy. The rise of fascism in the 1930s eventually culminated in the Second World War, the deadliest conflict in human history. The Allies prevailed in the war by 1945, and their victory set the stage for the Cold War between the communist Eastern Bloc and the liberal Western Alliance.

In the United Kingdom, the Liberal Party lost its influence in the early 20th century due to the growth of the Labour Party. In Russia, liberalism was defeated when the Communists came to power under Vladimir Lenin in October 1917, in Italy when Mussolini set up his dictatorship in 1922, in Poland in 1926 under Józef Piłsudski, and in Spain in 1939 after the Spanish Civil War. Before World War I, liberal parties dominated the European political scene, but they were gradually displaced by socialists and social democrats in the early 20th century. The fortunes of liberal parties since World War II have been mixed, with some gaining strength while others suffered from continuous declines. The fall of the Soviet Union and the breakup of Yugoslavia at the end of the 20th century, however, allowed the formation of many liberal parties throughout Eastern Europe. These parties developed varying ideological characters. Some, such as the Slovenian Liberal Democrats or the Lithuanian Social Liberals, have been characterised as centre-left. Others, such as the Romanian National Liberal Party, have been classified as centre-right.

In the United Kingdom, the comprehensive welfare state was built after the Second World War. Although it was largely accomplished by the Labour Party, it was also significantly designed by intellectuals from the Liberal Party, especially John Maynard Keynes, who laid the economic foundations, and by William Beveridge, who designed the welfare system.

In 1988, the British Liberal Party joined with the Labour splinter Social Democratic Party to form the Liberal Democrats. Following the general election of 2010, the Liberal Democrats formed a coalition government with the Conservatives, giving them ministers. However, the Liberal Democrats lost 49 of their 56 seats in the 2015 general election, with their review of the result concluding that a number of policy reversals were responsible for their poor electoral performance.

In Western Europe, liberal parties have often cooperated with socialist and social democratic parties, as evidenced by the Purple Coalition in the Netherlands during the late 1990s and into the 21st century. The Purple Coalition, one of the most consequential in Dutch history, brought together the progressive left-liberal D66, the economic liberal and centre-right VVD, and the social democratic Labour Party—an unusual combination that ultimately legalised same-sex marriage, euthanasia, and prostitution while also instituting a non-enforcement policy on marijuana.

=== Oceania ===
In Australia, liberalism is primarily championed by the centre-right Liberal Party. The Liberals are a fusion of classical liberal and conservative forces and are affiliated with the centre-right International Democrat Union.

== Historiography ==
=== Michel Foucault ===
French intellectual Michel Foucault locates the emergence of liberalism, both as a political philosophy and a mode of governance, in the sixteenth century. He especially focuses on Adam Smith, David Hume and Adam Ferguson. According to Foucault, it was through a double movement, of state centralisation on the one hand and of dispersion and religious dissidence on the other, that this problem of government presented itself clearly for the first time.

The central question, or problem of government, in relation to the birth of liberalism, was how to apply the form of governance of the family, the ‘economy’, to the state as a whole. How to introduce the meticulous attention of the father within the family home and the family unit, to the management of the state? The birth of liberalism can be located in the response to this question or problem of government. The response witnessed the shift from the dominance of sovereign power to the apparatus of the state, and can be characterised in three important developments:

Liberalism, as a ‘rationality’ of governing was, in Foucault's mind, unique from other previous technologies of governing, as it had as its foundation the assumption that human behaviour should be governed, in the pursuit of fostering the idea that society be understood as a realm separate from the state, not just something that was drawn off of and violated in order to strengthen the state. In a Foucauldian sense, liberalism did not emerge as a doctrine of how to simply govern people, but rather as a technology of governing that arose from the timeless critique of excessive government—"a search for a technology of government that could address the recurrent complaint that authorities were governing too much".

== See also ==
- History of conservatism
- History of human thought
- History of socialism
- Intellectual history
- The Machiavellian Moment
- Liberalism and nationalism#History
- Pierre Manent

== Sources and further reading ==
- Alnes, Jan Harald, and Manuel Toscano. Varieties of Liberalism: Contemporary Challenges (2014).
- Alterman, Eric. Why We're Liberals. New York: Viking Adult, 2008. ISBN 0-670-01860-0.
- Ameringer, Charles. Political parties of the Americas, 1980s to 1990s. Westport: Greenwood Publishing Group, 1992. ISBN 0-313-27418-5.
- Auerbach, Alan and Kotlikoff, Laurence. Macroeconomics Cambridge: MIT Press, 1998. ISBN 0-262-01170-0.
- Bernstein, Richard. Thomas Jefferson: The Revolution of Ideas. New York: Oxford University Press US, 2004. ISBN 0-19-514368-X.
- Chabal, Emile. "The Agonies of Liberalism." Contemporary European History 26.1 (2017): 161–173. online Archived 2020-08-01 at the Wayback Machine
- Coker, Christopher. Twilight of the West. Boulder: Westview Press, 1998. ISBN 0-8133-3368-7.
- Colomer, Josep Maria. Great Empires, Small Nations. New York: Routledge, 2007. ISBN 0-415-43775-X.
- Colton, Joel and Palmer, R.R. A History of the Modern World. New York: McGraw Hill, Inc., 1995. ISBN 0-07-040826-2.
- Copleston, Frederick. A History of Philosophy: Volume V. New York: Doubleday, 1959. ISBN 0-385-47042-8.
- Delaney, Tim. The march of unreason: science, democracy, and the new fundamentalism. New York: Oxford University Press, 2005. ISBN 0-19-280485-5.
- Diamond, Larry. The Spirit of Democracy. New York: Macmillan, 2008. ISBN 0-8050-7869-X.
- Dobson, John. Bulls, Bears, Boom, and Bust. Santa Barbara: ABC-CLIO, 2006. ISBN 1-85109-553-5.
- Doherty, Brian (2007). Radicals for Capitalism: A Freewheeling History of the Modern American Libertarian Movement.
- Dorrien, Gary. The making of American liberal theology. Louisville: Westminster John Knox Press, 2001. ISBN 0-664-22354-0.
- Fawcett, Edmund. Liberalism: The Life of an Idea (2014).
- Flamm, Michael and Steigerwald, David. Debating the 1960s: liberal, conservative, and radical perspectives. Lanham: Rowman & Littlefield, 2008. ISBN 0-7425-2212-1.
- Gallagher, Michael et al. Representative government in modern Europe. New York: McGraw Hill, 2001. ISBN 0-07-232267-5.
- Godwin, Kenneth et al. School choice tradeoffs: liberty, equity, and diversity. Austin: University of Texas Press, 2002. ISBN 0-292-72842-5.
- Gould, Andrew. Origins of liberal dominance. Ann Arbor: University of Michigan Press, 1999. ISBN 0-472-11015-2.
- Gray, John. Liberalism. Minneapolis: University of Minnesota Press, 1995. ISBN 0-8166-2801-7.
- Grigsby, Ellen. Analyzing Politics: An Introduction to Political Science. Florence: Cengage Learning, 2008. ISBN 0-495-50112-3.
- Hartz, Louis. The liberal tradition in America. New York: Houghton Mifflin Harcourt, 1955. ISBN 0-15-651269-6. online
- Hafner, Danica and Ramet, Sabrina. Democratic transition in Slovenia: value transformation, education, and media. College Station: Texas A&M University Press, 2006. ISBN 1-58544-525-8.
- Handelsman, Michael. Culture and Customs of Ecuador. Westport: Greenwood Press, 2000. ISBN 0-313-30244-8.
- Heywood, Andrew. Political Ideologies: An Introduction. New York: Palgrave Macmillan, 2003. ISBN 0-333-96177-3.
- Hodge, Carl. Encyclopedia of the Age of Imperialism, 1800–1944. Westport: Greenwood Publishing Group, 2008. ISBN 0-313-33406-4.
- Jensen, Pamela Grande. Finding a new feminism: rethinking the woman question for liberal democracy. Lanham: Rowman & Littlefield, 1996. ISBN 0-8476-8189-0.
- Karatnycky, Adrian et al. Nations in transit, 2001. Piscataway: Transaction Publishers, 2001. ISBN 0-7658-0897-8.
- Karatnycky, Adrian. Freedom in the World. Piscataway: Transaction Publishers, 2000. ISBN 0-7658-0760-2.
- Kerber, Linda. The Republican Mother. Baltimore: Johns Hopkins University Press, 1976.
- Kirchner, Emil. Liberal parties in Western Europe. Cambridge: Cambridge University Press, 1988. ISBN 0-521-32394-0.
- Knoop, Todd. Recessions and Depressions Westport: Greenwood Press, 2004. ISBN 0-313-38163-1.
- Lightfoot, Simon. Europeanizing social democracy?: the rise of the Party of European Socialists. New York: Routledge, 2005. ISBN 0-415-34803-X.
- Mackenzie, G. Calvin and Weisbrot, Robert. The liberal hour: Washington and the politics of change in the 1960s. New York: Penguin Group, 2008. ISBN 1-59420-170-6.
- Manent, Pierre and Seigel, Jerrold. An Intellectual History of Liberalism. Princeton: Princeton University Press, 1996. ISBN 0-691-02911-3.
- Mazower, Mark. Dark Continent. New York: Vintage Books, 1998. ISBN 0-679-75704-X.
- Monsma, Stephen and Soper, J. Christopher. The Challenge of Pluralism: Church and State in Five Democracies. Lanham: Rowman & Littlefield, 2008. ISBN 0-7425-5417-1.
- Peerenboom, Randall. China modernizes. New York: Oxford University Press, 2007. ISBN 0-19-920834-4.
- Perry, Marvin et al. Western Civilization: Ideas, Politics, and Society. Florence, KY: Cengage Learning, 2008. ISBN 0-547-14742-2.
- Pierson, Paul. The New Politics of the Welfare State. New York: Oxford University Press, 2001. ISBN 0-19-829756-4.
- Riff, Michael. Dictionary of modern political ideologies. Manchester: Manchester University Press, 1990. ISBN 0-7190-3289-X.
- Roberts, J.M. The Penguin History of the World. New York: Penguin Group, 1992. ISBN 0-19-521043-3.
- Ros, Agustin. Profits for all?: the cost and benefits of employee ownership. New York: Nova Publishers, 2001. ISBN 1-59033-061-7.
- Ryan, Alan. The Making of Modern Liberalism (Princeton UP, 2012).
- Scott, Jonathan (January 2008) [2004]. "Sidney [Sydney], Algernon (1623–1683)". Oxford Dictionary of National Biography (online ed.). Oxford University Press. doi:10.1093/ref:odnb/25519. (Subscription, Wikipedia Library access or UK public library membership required.)
- Shaw, G. K. Keynesian Economics: The Permanent Revolution. Aldershot, England: Edward Elgar Publishing Company, 1988. ISBN 1-85278-099-1.
- Sinclair, Timothy. Global governance: critical concepts in political science. Oxford: Taylor & Francis, 2004. ISBN 0-415-27662-4.
- Song, Robert. Christianity and Liberal Society. Oxford: Oxford University Press, 2006. ISBN 0-19-826933-1.
- Stacy, Lee. Mexico and the United States. New York: Marshall Cavendish Corporation, 2002. ISBN 0-7614-7402-1.
- Steindl, Frank. Understanding Economic Recovery in the 1930s. Ann Arbor: University of Michigan Press, 2004. ISBN 0-472-11348-8.
- Susser, Bernard. Political ideology in the modern world. Upper Saddle River: Allyn and Bacon, 1995. ISBN 0-02-418442-X.
- Van Schie, P. G. C. and Voermann, Gerrit. The dividing line between success and failure: a comparison of Liberalism in the Netherlands and Germany in the 19th and 20th Centuries. Berlin: LIT Verlag Berlin-Hamburg-Münster, 2006. ISBN 3-8258-7668-3.
- Various authors. Countries of the World & Their Leaders Yearbook 08, Volume 2. Detroit: Thomson Gale, 2007. ISBN 0-7876-8108-3.
- West, Thomas G. (1996). "Foreword". Discourses Concerning Government. Indianapolis: Liberty Fund. ISBN 0865971412.
- Wolfe, Alan. The Future of Liberalism. New York: Random House, Inc., 2009. ISBN 0-307-38625-2.
- Wooldridge, Adrian (2026). The Revolutionary Center: The Lost Genius of Liberalism. Pegasus Books. ISBN 978-1639369379.
- Worell, Judith. Encyclopedia of women and gender, Volume I. Amsterdam: Elsevier, 2001. ISBN 0-12-227246-3.
- Young, Shaun. Beyond Rawls: an analysis of the concept of political liberalism. Lanham: University Press of America, 2002. ISBN 0-7618-2240-2.
- Zvesper, John. Nature and liberty. New York: Routledge, 1993. ISBN 0-415-08923-9.

=== Britain ===
- Adams, Ian. Ideology and politics in Britain today. Manchester: Manchester University Press, 1998. ISBN 0-7190-5056-1.
- Cook, Richard. The Grand Old Man. Whitefish: Kessinger Publishing, 2004. ISBN 1-4191-6449-X on Gladstone.
- Falco, Maria. Feminist interpretations of Mary Wollstonecraft. State College: Penn State Press, 1996. ISBN 0-271-01493-8.
- Forster, Greg. John Locke's politics of moral consensus. Cambridge: Cambridge University Press, 2005. ISBN 0-521-84218-2.
- Gross, Jonathan. Byron: the erotic liberal. Lanham: Rowman & Littlefield Publishers, Inc., 2001. ISBN 0-7425-1162-6.
- Locke, John. A Letter Concerning Toleration: Humbly Submitted. CreateSpace, 2009. ISBN 978-1-4495-2376-3.
- Locke, John. Two Treatises of Government. reprint, New York: Hafner Publishing Company, Inc., 1947. ISBN 0-02-848500-9.
- Roach, John. "Liberalism and the Victorian Intelligentsia." Cambridge Historical Journal 13#1 (1957): 58–81. online Archived 2020-09-02 at the Wayback Machine.
- Wempe, Ben. T. H. Green's theory of positive freedom: from metaphysics to political theory. Exeter: Imprint Academic, 2004. ISBN 0-907845-58-4.

=== France ===
- Frey, Linda and Frey, Marsha. The French Revolution. Westport: Greenwood Press, 2004. ISBN 0-313-32193-0.
- Hanson, Paul. Contesting the French Revolution. Hoboken: Blackwell Publishing, 2009. ISBN 1-4051-6083-7.
- Leroux, Robert, Political Economy and Liberalism in France: The Contributions of Frédéric Bastiat, London and New York, Routledge, 2011.
- Leroux, Robert, and David Hart (eds), French Liberalism in the 19th century. An Anthology, London and New York, Routledge, 2012.
- Lyons, Martyn. Napoleon Bonaparte and the Legacy of the French Revolution. New York: St. Martin's Press, Inc., 1994. ISBN 0-312-12123-7.
- Shlapentokh, Dmitry. The French Revolution and the Russian Anti-Democratic Tradition. Edison, NJ: Transaction Publishers, 1997. ISBN 1-56000-244-1.
