= Tercüman-ı Ahvâl =

Newspaper in Ottoman Empire (1860–1866)

- Founder: Agah Efendi
- Editor-in-chief: İbrahim Şinasi
- Founded: 22 October 1860
- Ceased publication: 11 March 1866
- Language: Ottoman Turkish
- Headquarters: Constantinople
- Country: Ottoman Empire

Tercüman-ı Ahvâl (Ottoman Turkish: Interpreter of Events) was an Ottoman newspaper which existed between 1860 and 1866 in Istanbul. It is the first privately owned publication in the Empire and is known for its founder, Agah Efendi. It is also the first newspaper started and published by a Turk in the country.

== History and profile ==
Tercüman-ı Ahvâl was established by Agah Efendi in 1860, and its first issue appeared on 22 October that year. Ibrahim Şinasi helped him to launch the paper. He also served as its editor-in-chief and argued in the first editorial that featuring only news was not enough. Şinasi left the paper in 1862 to start his own paper called Tasvîr-i Efkâr. Tercüman-ı Ahvâl came out three days per week, but later it appeared five times per week. From the 740th issue the paper published daily except for Fridays. In addition to national news, it featured news translated from The Times, La Patrie, and Levant Herald. It covered political, educational and economic news and writings which were written by Ahmed Vefik Pasha, Sarı Tevfik Bey, Mehmed Şerif Bey, Refik Bey and Hasan Subhi Efendi. The paper also featured literary work becoming the first Ottoman periodical in this regard. From its second issue Şinasi's play entitled Şair Evlenmesi (Ottoman Turkish: Poet’s Marriage) which was the first play written in Turkish was serialized in the paper. It also featured Şinasi's poems and French poems translated by him. The first press conflict in the Ottoman Empire occurred between Tercüman-ı Ahvâl and Ceride-i Havadis.

Tercüman-ı Ahvâl enjoyed higher levels of circulation. However, it was temporarily banned several times. The first ban was immediately after its start due to its critical approach towards the government. It was again banned in May 1861 for two weeks because of its criticisms over the educational system in the Ottoman Empire. The last edition of Tercüman-ı Ahvâl appeared on 11 March 1866, and it produced 792 issues during its lifetime.
