= Şinasi Stage =

Theatre in Turkey

- Şinasi Sahnesi
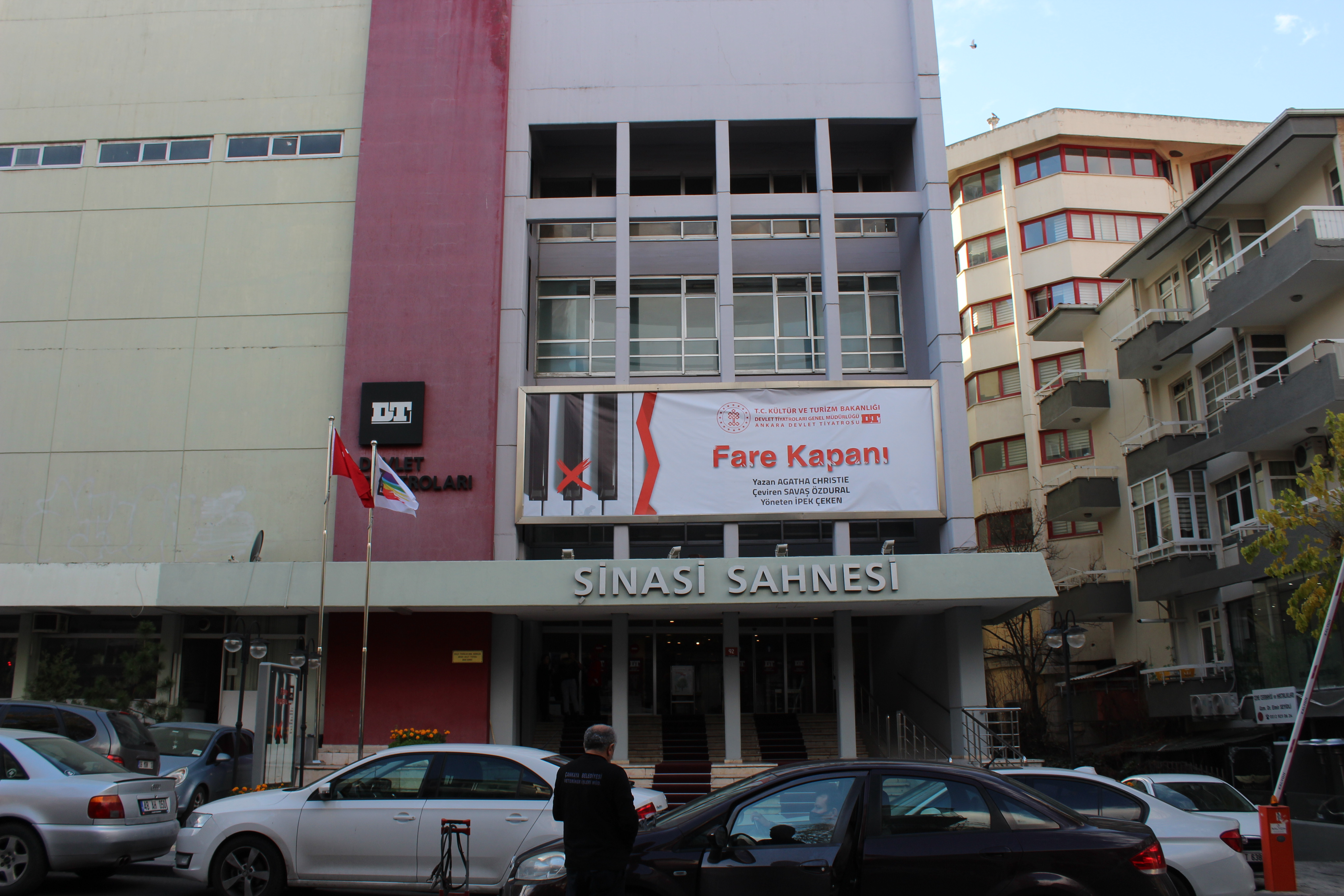
- Main entrance of the stage (2021)
- Interactive map of Şinasi Stage
- Full name: Ankara State Theatre Şinasi Stage
- Former names: Çağdaş Sahne Kültür Merkezi
- Address: Tunus Street No: 92, Remzi Oğuz Arık/Çankaya; Ankara; Turkey
- Operator: Ankara State Theatre
- Capacity: 490
- Type: Theatre

Construction
- Opened: 13 March 1988
- Years active: 1988-present

Şinasi Stage (Turkish: Şinasi Sahnesi) is a theatre in Çankaya district of Ankara, Turkey. It is operated by the Turkish State Theatres. The theatre is named after İbrahim Şinasi, the pioneering 19th-century Ottoman Turkish author, playwright, and journalist.
