= İbrahim Şinasi =

Turkish journalist, author and poet (1826–1871)

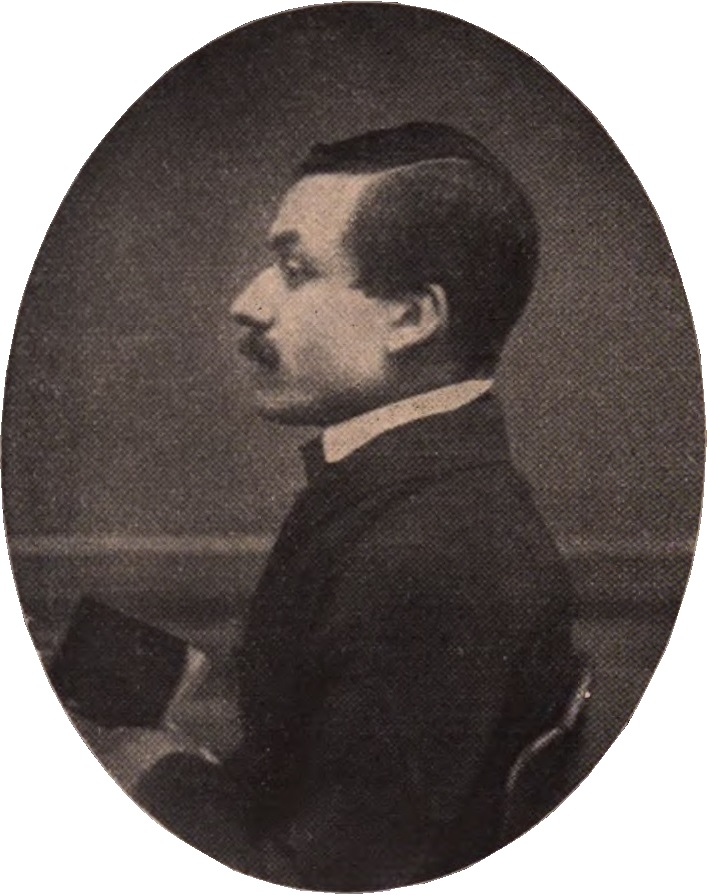
- İbrahim Şinasi Efendi, Paris, sometime between 1849 and 1853.
- Born: 5 August 1826; Istanbul, Ottoman Empire
- Died: 13 September 1871 (aged 45); Istanbul, Ottoman Empire
- Occupations: Journalist, poet, playwright, newspaper editor
- Writing career
- Language: Ottoman Turkish, Turkish
- Notable work: The Wedding of a Poet (Turkish: Şair Evlenmesi)

İbrahim Şinasi Efendi (Ottoman Turkish: ابراهيم شناسى أفندی, romanized: ʾİbrâhîm Şinâsî ʾEfendî; 5 August 1826 – 13 September 1871) was a pioneering Ottoman intellectual, founder of Turkish dramaturgy, author, journalist, translator, playwright, linguist and newspaper editor. He was an innovator across several fields: authoring one of the earliest examples of an Ottoman play, encouraging the translation of French poetry into Turkish, simplifying the script used for writing the Ottoman Turkish language, and being one of the first Ottoman writers to write specifically for the broader public. Şinasi used his newspapers, Tercüman-ı Ahvâl and Tasvîr-i Efkâr, to promote the proliferation of European Enlightenment ideals during the Tanzimat period, and he made the education of the literate Ottoman public his personal vocation. Though many of Şinasi's projects were incomplete at the time of his death, "he was at the forefront of a number of fields and put his stamp on the development of each field so long as it contained unsolved problems."

Şinasi was an early proponent of a constitution for the Empire. Along with his colleague and friend Namık Kemal, Şinasi was one of the foremost leaders of the Young Ottomans, a secret society of Ottoman Turkish intellectuals pushing for further reform in the Ottoman Empire after Tanzimat in order to modernize and revitalize it by bringing it into line with the rest of Europe. Although Şinasi died before their goals for reform came to fruition, the Young Ottomans' efforts directly led to the first attempt at constitutional monarchy in the Empire in 1876, when the short-lived First Constitutional Era ushered in the writing of an Ottoman constitution and the creation of a bicameral parliament. Through his work as a political activist and one of the foremost literary figures of his time, Şinasi laid the groundwork in the minds of the public for contemporary and later reforms in the Ottoman Empire and, later, the modern Republic of Turkey.

== His life ==
=== Early life ===
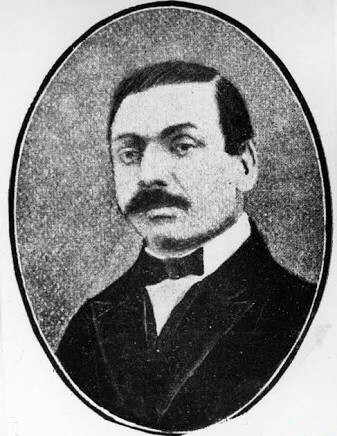
A depiction of İbrahim Şinasi

İbrahim Şinasi was born in Constantinople (modern Istanbul) in 1826 during a period of uncertainty in the Ottoman Empire. By ethnic origin he was a Rutulian. Şinasi's father served as an artillery captain in the Ottoman army and died during one of the Russo-Turkish wars. He was raised by his mother and relatives and began his education at a neighborhood school. Şinasi attended elementary school with the intention of becoming a clerk for the military. He took a position with the Müşiriyet Armory, while taking lessons in Arabic, Persian, and French. At a young age, he established a close relationship with the famed reformer Mustafa Reşid Pasha, who helped him earn a government grant to study finance in Paris.

While in Paris, Şinasi also studied mathematics, science, and history, but he began to develop what would become a lifelong affection for literature. There, Şinasi came into contact with French literature and intellectuals; he was impressed by Enlightenment ideas and cultivated relationships with Lamartine, Ernest Renan, and other French intellectuals. Among other things, he was a member of the Société Asiatique. During his time in Paris, he translated several works from French into Ottoman Turkish.

=== Government career ===
Şinasi's brief stint as a government official involved a position on the Educational Committee. This group was responsible for the evaluation and restructuring of Ottoman schools. He served as a member of this organization upon his return from Paris in 1853 until he was dismissed. He would be reinstated only to be removed from the position again in 1863. It is likely that his dismissal was a result of his burgeoning journalistic activities criticizing the government and promoting "European" ideas. On the day before Şinasi's second dismissal from the Educational Committee, he had written an article advocating for the tenet "no taxation without representation". After his removal from his government post, Şinasi returned to Paris to focus on his writing and linguistic study. It is speculated that conflicts with some of the Tanzimat reformers, such as Mehmed Emin Âli Pasha and Mehmed Fuad Pasha, encouraged Şinasi to leave the country.

=== Journalism period ===
Şinasi's most notable enterprise in journalism was founding the publication Tasvîr-i Efkâr, or "Interpreter of Ideas", in 1862. It was the first truly influential newspaper in the Ottoman Empire. This publication was the successor to another newspaper called Tercüman-ı Ahvâl that Şinasi had previously founded and edited with his associate Agah Efendi. In these newspapers, he employed a "journalistic Turkish" that was heavily influenced by the coarser language of average Ottoman Turks (kaba Türkçe). He advocated strongly for an increasing Westernization of the Ottoman Empire and also for "encyclopedism"; he believed that the public should be educated in a wide variety of subject areas, so his pieces frequently included references to figures, such as Plato or Newton, and elevated concepts such as natural law.

=== Involvement with the Young Ottomans and exile ===
After joining the reformist secret society Young Ottomans in 1865 and going into exile in Paris, Şinasi transferred the management of the Tasvir-i Efkâr to his employee and colleague Namık Kemal.

=== Later life and death ===
Şinasi returned to Istanbul in 1869, where "he lived as a recluse in some financial need." He opened a printing house and began to have his works printed and published. Soon afterwards, on 13 September 1871, he died of a brain tumor at the age of 45.

== His views ==
=== Politics ===
Şinasi, influenced by Enlightenment thought, saw freedom of expression as a fundamental right and used journalism in order to engage, communicate with, and educate the public. By speaking directly to the public about government affairs, Şinasi declared that state actions were not solely the interest of the government. In the first issue of his first newspaper, Şinasi wrote, "Since people who live in a society have a duty of loyalty to various official obligations, it necessarily follows that a part of their rights consists of the dissemination of verbal and written ideas to promote the interests of the motherland."

While being a patriot and populist per his inclination towards the regular people's language, Şinasi was also a romantic and internationalist. He declared, in his writing, that "my nation is humankind, and my motherland is the earth" (Ottoman Turkish: ملتم نوع بشر در وطنم روی زمین, romanized: Milletim nevʿ-i beşerdir, vaṭanım rûy-i zemîn). As it was noted by Ahmet Hamdi Tanpınar, this line was inspired from Victor Hugo's Les Burgraves' closing remarks: "... to have the world as its motherland and humanity as its nation" (French: ... avoir pour patrie le monde et pour nation l'humanité.).

=== Language ===
Şinasi's major contributions to reform and to Ottoman and Turkish culture were the result of his use of language. Prior to Şinasi, Namık Kemal, and Ziya Pasha, Ottoman writing was largely split into elite literature and folk literature. The writing of the elites was almost exclusively poetry (divan şiiri) of a strict form, meter, and rhyme. It was written strictly in the Ottoman Turkish language, which incorporated vocabulary words from Arabic and Persian that were beyond the understanding of the common people (who spoke "vulgar Turkish" (kaba Türkçe), which more resembled Modern Turkish); it emphasized artistic excellence over communication. The elites wrote for each other, rather than for the general public. Both elite and folk literature incorporated elements of the Islamic tradition, but popular writing drew heavily on the Central Asian roots of the Ottomans. It employed both verse and prose, but members of the elite did not take it seriously.

Şinasi altered the paradigm of writing within the Ottoman Empire by simplifying the language, intentionally engaging directly with an increasingly literate public, and introducing new, more European, genres to the masses. He attempted to forge a pure Turkish (öz Türkçe), through the elimination of words borrowed from other languages in order to make the content and style of his work more appealing and easier to comprehend. At the time of his death, Şinasi was working on a large-scale Turkish dictionary in order to help formalize the language. He also simplified the Arabic-based Ottoman Turkish script, combining the nashk and kufi calligraphy, but he "only succeeded in reducing the more than five hundred signs used since Muteferrika first cut his type to 112.".

== Literature ==
In addition to his work as a journalist, Şinasi was a poet, translator, and playwright. In 1853, he published a collection of poems called Divan-i Şinasi. He is frequently labeled the "founder of the modern school of Ottoman literature." He earned this title based on his alteration of the Turkish verse to be more consistent with the French model and his translation of many French poems into Turkish. "He drew attention to European literature, expressed the need to make translations from it, and disseminated his belief—which became a correct prophecy—that a modern Turkish literature would be born on the models of Western literature." His translations of poetry, in addition to his French to Turkish translations of Enlightenment thinkers, encouraged others to translate significant works of European thinkers and contributed to the Westernization of the Ottoman Empire.

=== The Wedding of a Poet ===
Arguably, Şinasi's most famous work was the play The Wedding of a Poet (Turkish: Şair Evlenmesi). It was not the first theatrical work written in a Turkic language, as the Azerbaijani playwright Mirza Fatali Akhundov's work had appeared first, but it was the first widely recognized play written by an Ottoman person in the style of modern European theatrical productions, and it had a strong influence on the canon of plays that followed. The one-act comedy was written in 1859 but was not published until 1860. It was printed as a serial, in parts called Tefriqa in his newspaper Tercüman-ı Ahvâl in response to the growing popularity of theater in the Ottoman Empire. European acting troupes from London, Paris, St. Petersburg, and other major cities increased the demand for plays amongst the people of the Middle East, particularly in urban centers like Tbilisi, Istanbul, and Cairo. In writing this play, as was typical of his artistic style, Şinasi employed a Turkish language that was closer to the vernacular, rather than the vocabulary and structures previously used by the cultural elite. He intentionally distorted the way he spelled words in order to make the language more phonetic and to aid in the performance of the play. He included Arabic letters in his writing, contributing to the "anarchy which finally ended in the downfall of Arabic script."

This play was also novel in Ottoman circles, because it directly and satirically addressed issues of contemporary interest. Şinasi used the play to criticize both traditionalists and the newly-developing class of liberal elite. He targeted traditionalists for continuing to engage in arranged marriages through middlemen. In the play, a poor young man became infatuated with a beautiful woman, but according to Muslim tradition, grooms were unable to see the faces of their brides until after the marriage contract was finalized. The family of the beautiful woman used the stipulation to their advantage, when they secretly replaced the young poet's beloved with her highly unattractive older sister. The young man was eventually reunited with his darling through misdeeds of his own. Throughout the play, Şinasi also took advantage of humor to condemn the frequent arrogance and pretentiousness of the "self-styled intellectuals".

The play is presumed to have been commissioned to be performed at the Dolmabahçe Palace's court theater, but a performance may or may not have taken place at that location. It is believed that the first English translation of the play was published in 1981.

The Şinasi Sahnesi theatre in Ankara, Turkey was named in honour of Şinasi.

== Works ==
- Tercüme-i Manzume (1859, translation of poems from the French of La Fontaine, Lamartine, Gilbert, and Racine)
- Şair Evlenmesi (1859, the first Ottoman play, "The Wedding of a Poet")
- Durub-i Emsal-i Osmaniye (1863, the first book of Turkish proverbs)
- Müntahabat-ı Eş'ar (1863, collection of poems)
