= Agah Efendi =

Ottoman writer (1832–1885)

Çapanzade Agah Efendi
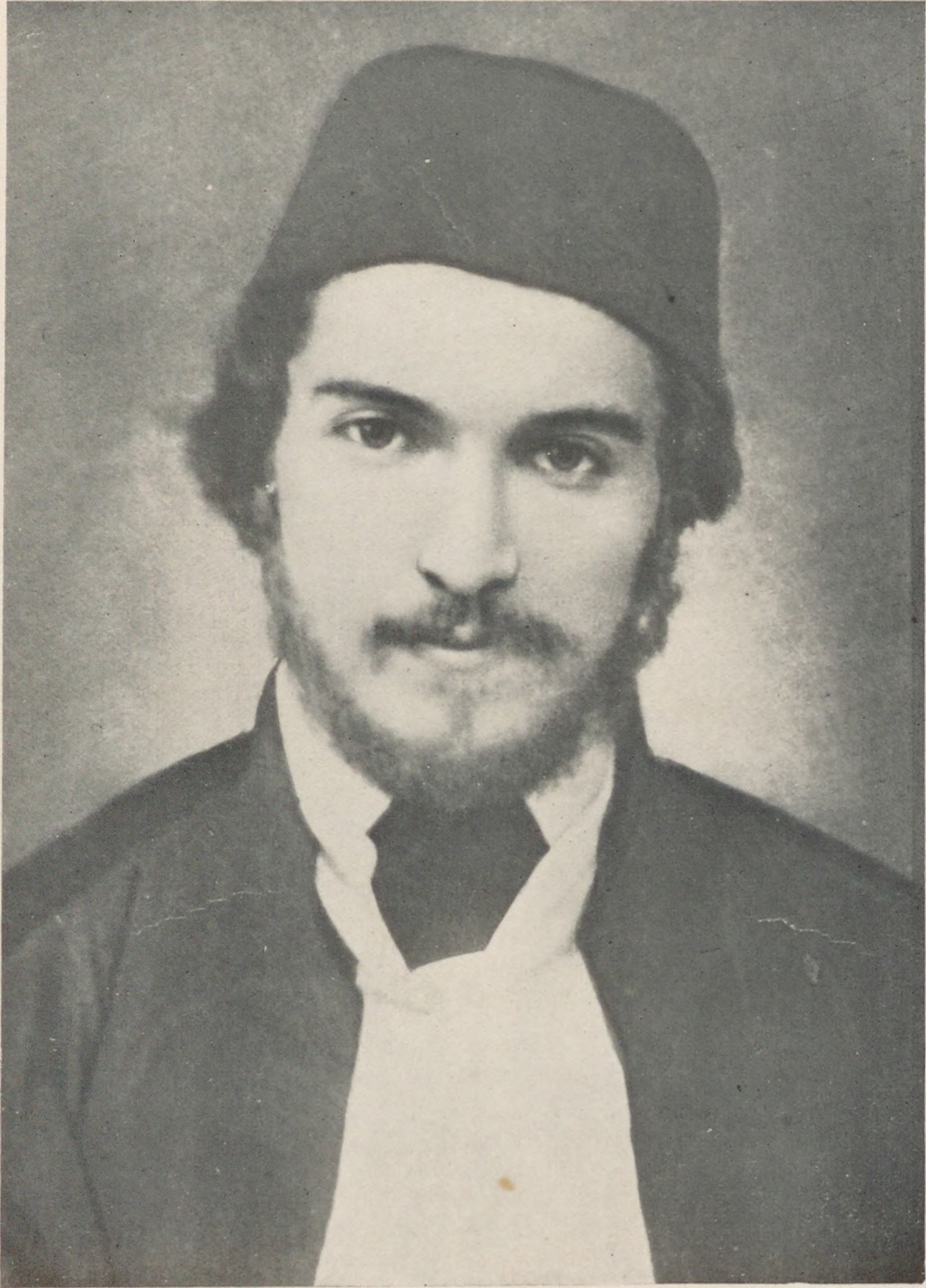
- Agah Efendi
- Born: March 31, 1832; Constantinople, Ottoman Empire
- Died: January 2, 1886 (aged 53); Athens, Kingdom of Greece
- Occupations: Journalist, writer
- Family: Çapanoğlu family

Çapanzade Agah Efendi (March 31, 1832 – January 2, 1886) was an Ottoman Turkish civil servant, writer and newspaper editor. Along with his colleague İbrahim Şinasi, he published Tercüman-ı Ahvâl ("Interpreter of Events"), the first private newspaper produced by Turkish journalists, and introduced postage stamps to the Ottoman Empire.

== Biography ==
Agah Efendi was born in the Ottoman capital Constantinople to Çapanzade Ömer Hulûsi Efendi. He was educated in Constantinople, in the Mekteb-i Tıbbiye-i Şahane.

He is also known as being a member of the Young Ottomans, a reformist secret society that enabled the first introduction of a constitutional system to the Empire, resulting in the short-lived First Constitutional Era.

== See also ==
- History of Middle Eastern newspapers
