= John McConnell =

John McConnell may refer to:

== Business ==
- John Wilson McConnell (1877–1963), Canadian businessman, newspaper publisher, and philanthropist
- John H. McConnell (1923–2008), industrialist, philanthropist, and founder of the Columbus Blue Jackets
- John P. McConnell (businessman), former CEO of Worthington Industries

== Politics ==
- John E. McConnell (1863–1928), Wisconsin State Assemblyman
- John Henry McConnell (1860–1944), Canadian politician and member of the Manitoba Liberal Party
- John McConnell (Quebec politician) (1799–?), political figure in Canada East
- John R. McConnell (1826–1879), California attorney general

== Other ==
- J. C. McConnell (1844–1904), American scientific illustrator
- John McConnell (footballer, born 1881), Scottish footballer (Grimsby Town FC)
- John McConnell (footballer, born 1885), Scottish footballer (Liverpool FC)
- John P. McConnell (general) (1908–1986), U.S. Air Force Chief of Staff and general
- John McConnell (peace activist) (1915–2012), peace activist and creator of Earth Day
- Mike McConnell (U.S. Naval officer) (John Michael McConnell, born 1943), former director of the NSA and recent U.S. Director of National Intelligence
- John J. McConnell Jr. (born 1958), judge on the U.S. District Court for the District of Rhode Island
- John McConnell (actor) (born 1958), actor and radio host
- John Preston McConnell (fl. early 20th century), American academic
- John W. McConnell (academician), American college president
