= Barbecue =

Cooking method and apparatus

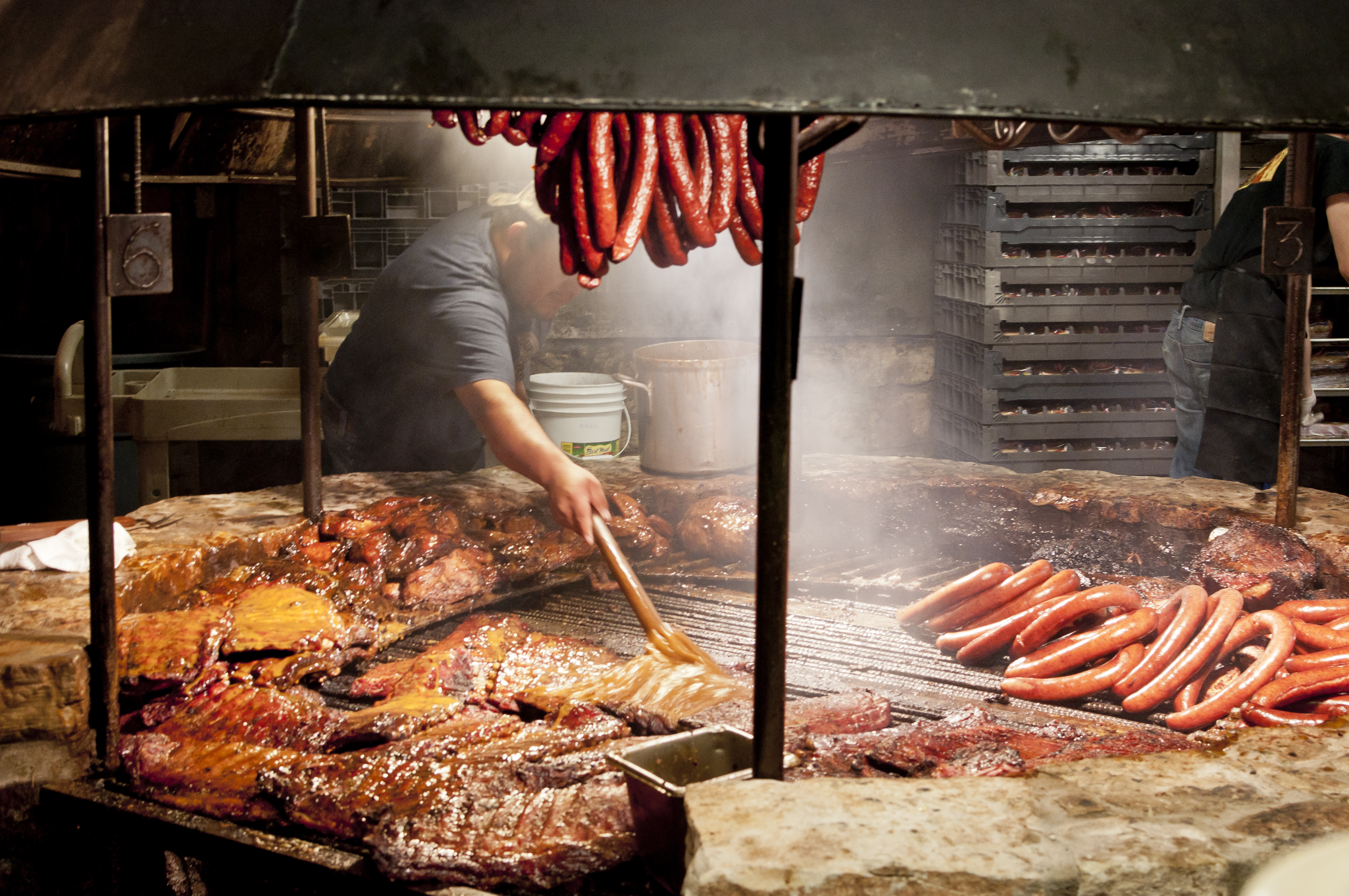
Meat being barbecued at The Salt Lick restaurant

Barbecue or barbeque (often shortened to BBQ worldwide; barbie or barby in Australia and New Zealand) is a term used with regional and national variations to describe various cooking methods, employing live fire and smoke to cook food.

The term is applied to the devices associated with those methods, the broader cuisines these methods produce, and the meals or gatherings at which this style of food is cooked and served. Though, the cooking methods associated with barbecuing vary.

The various regional variations of barbecue can be categorized into methods using direct or indirect heating. Indirect barbecues are associated with US cuisine, in which meat is heated by roasting or smoking over wood or charcoal. These methods of barbecue involve cooking, and using smoke at low temperatures with long cooking times for several hours.

Elsewhere, barbecuing more refers to the direct application of heat, grilling of food over hot coals or a gas fire. This technique is done over direct dry heat or a hot fire for a few minutes.

== Etymology and spelling ==
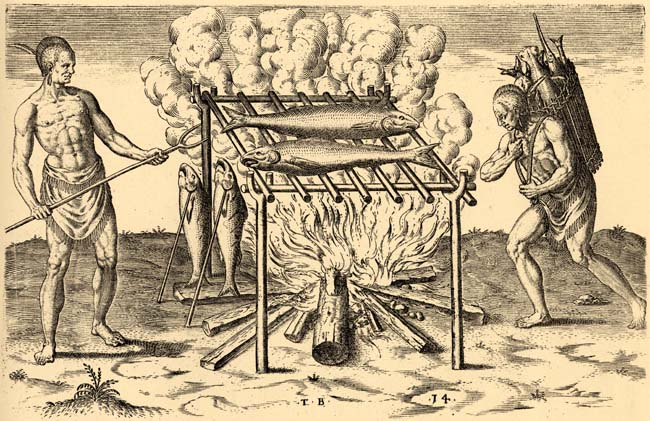
The original Arawak term barabicu was used to refer to a wooden framework. Among the framework's uses was the suspension of meat over a flame.

The English word barbecue and its cognates in other languages come from the Spanish word barbacoa, which has its origin in a Taíno word. Etymologists believe this to be derived from barabicu found in the language of the Arawak people of the Caribbean and the Timucua people of Florida. The Oxford English Dictionary (OED) traces the word to Hispaniola and translates it as a "framework of sticks set upon posts".

A popular folk etymology of the word says the term is derived from the French barbe à queue ("from beard to tail") signifying a whole animal being roasted on a spit, but this origin for the word is not supported by academic etymology.

The term itself has two spellings in English: "barbecue" and "barbeque". While in most countries the spelling "barbecue" is used, the spelling "barbeque" is sometimes used in Australia, New Zealand, and the US.

== History ==
Spanish explorer Gonzalo Fernández de Oviedo y Valdés was the first to print the word barbecoa in Spain in 1526 as part of the Diccionario de la Lengua Española (2nd Edition) of the Real Academia Española. After Columbus landed in the Americas in 1492, the Spaniards found Taíno roasting meat over a grill consisting of a wooden framework resting on sticks above a fire. This framework was also used to store food above ground and for sleeping. The flames and smoke rose and enveloped the meat, giving it a certain flavor. Spaniards called the framework a barbacoa.

Another form of barbacoa involves digging a hole in the ground, burning logs in it and placing stones in it to absorb and retain heat. Large cuts of meat, often wrapped in leaves, often a whole goat or lamb, are placed above a pot so the juices can be used to make a broth. It is then covered with maguey leaves and coal, and set alight. The cooking process takes a few hours. Olaudah Equiano, an African abolitionist, described this method of roasting alligators among the "Mosquito people" (Miskito people) on his journeys to Cabo Gracias a Dios on the Mosquito Coast, in his narrative The Interesting Narrative of the Life of Olaudah Equiano.

Linguists have suggested the word was loaned successively into Spanish, then Portuguese, French, and English. In the form barbacado, the word was used in English in 1648 by the supposed Beauchamp Plantagenet in the tract A description of the province of New Albion: "the Indians in stead of salt doe barbecado or dry and smoak fish".

According to the Oxford English Dictionary, the first recorded use in modern form was in 1661, in Edmund Hickeringill's Jamaica Viewed: "Some are slain, And their flesh forthwith Barbacu'd and eat"; it also appears in 1672 in the writings of John Lederer following his travels in the North American southeast in 1669–1670.

The first known use as a noun was in 1697 by the English buccaneer William Dampier. In his New Voyage Round the World, Dampier wrote, "and lay there all night, upon our Borbecu's, or frames of Sticks, raised about 3 foot [0.91 m] from the Ground".

As early as the 1730s, New England Puritans were familiar with barbecue, as on 4 November 1731, New London, Connecticut, resident Joshua Hempstead wrote in his diary: "I was at Madm Winthrops at an Entertainment, or Treat of Colln [Colonel] or Samll Brownes a Barbaqued." Samuel Johnson's 1755 dictionary gave the following definitions:

- "To Barbecue – a term for dressing a whole hog" (attestation to Pope)
- "Barbecue – a hog dressed whole"

While the standard modern English spelling of the word is barbecue, variations including barbeque and truncations such as bar-b-q or BBQ may also be found. The spelling barbeque is given in Merriam-Webster as a variant, whereas the Oxford Dictionaries explain it is a misspelling, not accepted in standard English and should be avoided. In the Southeastern United States, the word barbecue is used predominantly as a noun referring to roast pork, while in the Southwestern states cuts of beef are often cooked.

== Associations ==
Because the word barbecue came from native groups, Europeans gave it "savage connotations". This association with barbarians and "savages" is strengthened by Edmund Hickeringill's work Jamaica Viewed: with All the Ports, Harbours, and their Several Soundings, Towns, and Settlements through its descriptions of cannibalism. However, according to Andrew Warnes, there is very little proof Hickeringill's tale of cannibalism in the Caribbean is true. Another notable false depiction of cannibalistic barbecues appears in Theodor de Bry's Great Voyages, which in Warnes's eyes, "present smoke cookery as a custom quintessential to an underlying savagery [...] that everywhere contains within it a potential for cannibalistic violence". Today, people in the US associate barbecue with "classic Americana".

== Styles ==
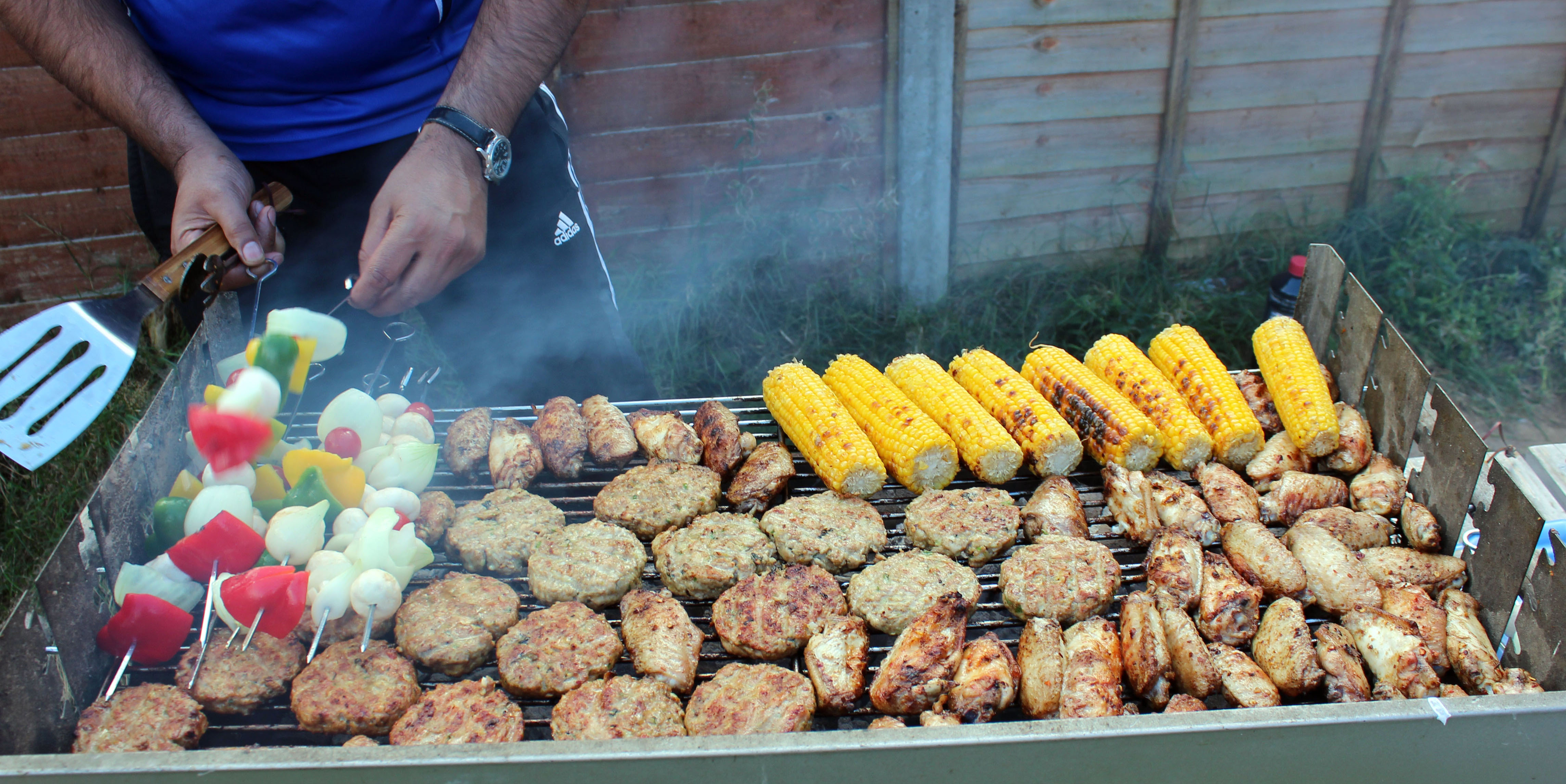
A British barbecue including chicken kebabs, marinated chicken wings, sweetcorn, and an assortment of vegetables

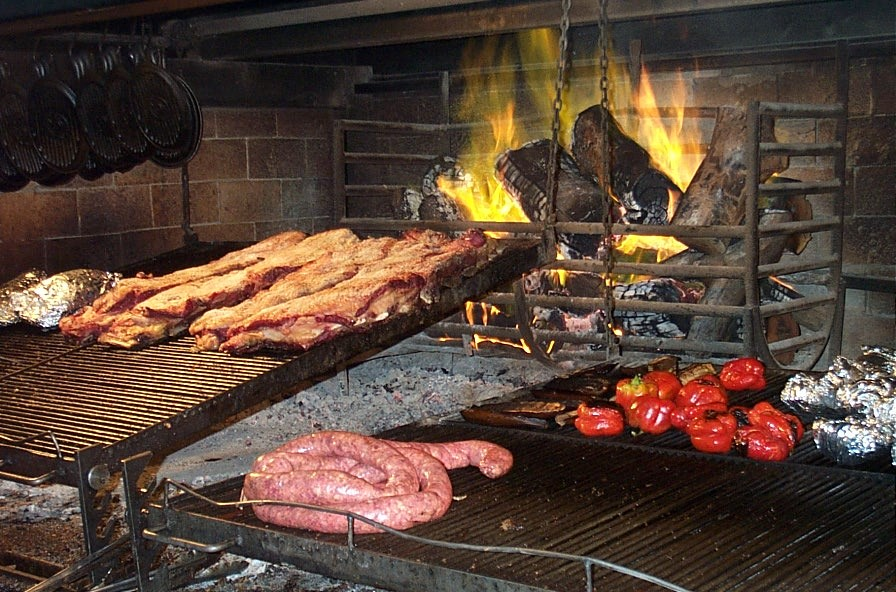
A typical asado in Argentina

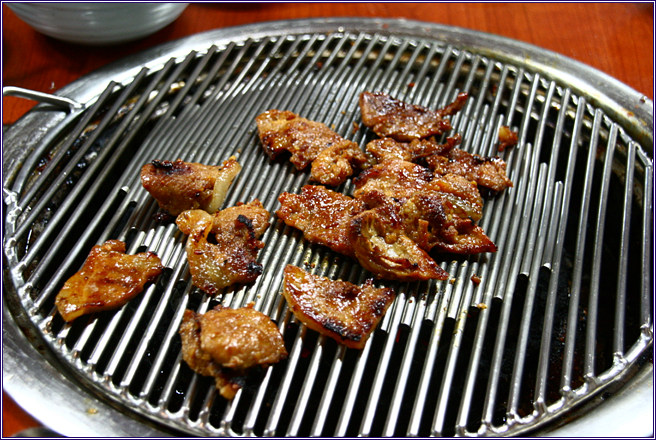
Korean barbeque grill used for cooking galbi

In American English usage, grilling refers to a fast process over high heat while barbecuing refers to a slow process using indirect heat or hot smoke, similar to some forms of roasting. In a typical US home grill, food is cooked on a grate directly over hot charcoal, while in a US barbecue the coals are dispersed to the sides or at a large distance from the grate. In British usage, barbecuing refers to a fast cooking process done directly over high heat, while grilling refers to cooking under a source of moderate-to-high heat, known in the United States as broiling. Its South American versions are the southern Brazilian churrasco and the Southern Cone asado.

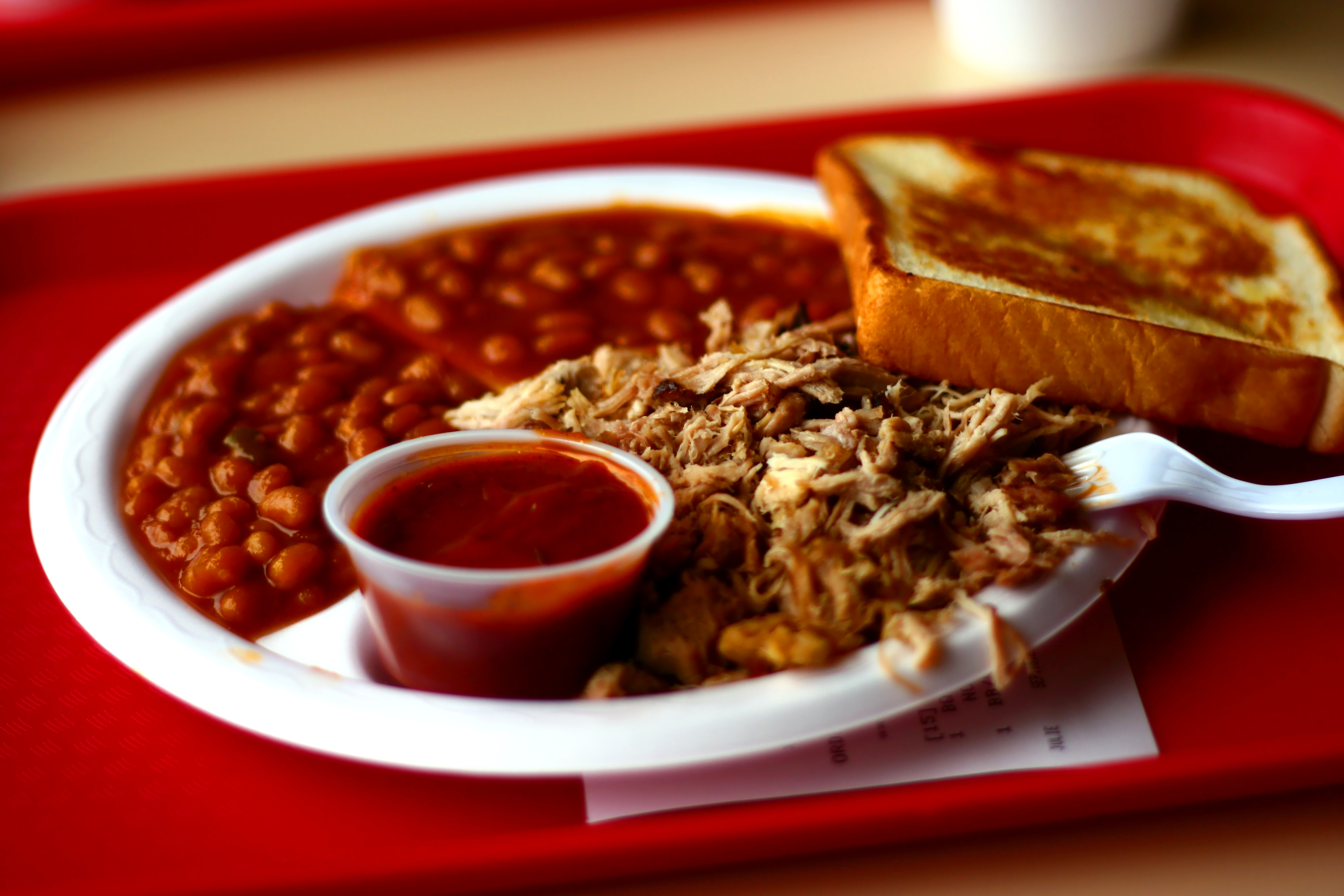
Typical plate of chopped pork barbecue as served in a restaurant with barbecue beans, sauce, and Texas toast

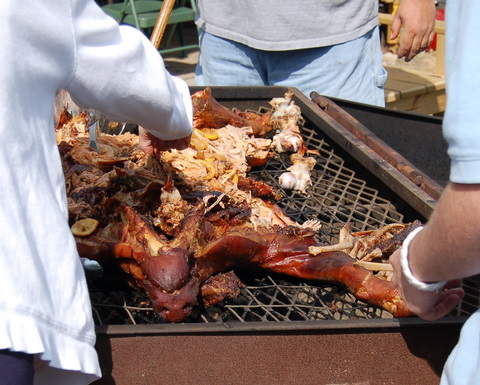
A barbecued pig

For barbecue in the United States, each Southern locale has its own variety of barbecue, particularly sauces. In recent years, the regional variations have blurred as restaurants and consumers experiment and adapt the styles of other regions. South Carolina is the only state featuring all four recognized barbecue sauces, including mustard-based, vinegar-based, and light and heavy tomato-based sauces. North Carolina sauces vary by region; eastern North Carolina uses a vinegar-based sauce, the center of the state uses Lexington-style barbecue, with a combination of ketchup and vinegar as its base, and western North Carolina uses a heavier ketchup base.

Memphis barbecue is best known for tomato- and vinegar-based sauces. In some Memphis establishments and in Kentucky, meat is rubbed with dry seasoning (dry rubs) and smoked over hickory wood without sauce. The finished barbecue is then served with barbecue sauce on the side.

Kansas City barbecue is barbecue originating in Kansas City, Missouri in the early 20th century. It is known for slow-smoked meats (including pork, beef, chicken, turkey, lamb, sausage, and sometimes fish) cooked over various woods, seasoned with a dry rub, and served with a thick, sweet, tomato-based sauce made from brown sugar, molasses, and tomatoes. St. Louis–style barbecue refers to spare ribs associated with the St. Louis area. These are grilled rather than slow-cooked over indirect heat with smoke which is associated with the term "barbecue" in the United States. Although St. Louis–style barbecue takes inspiration from other styles of barbecue it still retains its own distinct style. St. Louis style barbecue is known for its distinctive approach to ribs and sauce. The hallmark is the St. Louis–style spare rib cut, which is a rectangular, meaty cut with excess cartilage trimmed off for a uniform appearance and more meat compared to baby back ribs

In South Africa, braais are informal gatherings of people who convene around an open fire for any occasion and at any location with a grill, linked to the consistent warm weather of South Africa. The act of convening around a grill is reminiscent of past generations gathering around open fires after a hunt. Modernity has expanded grilling to the use of gas grills, but steel grill grates and campfires are often used. The use of a gas grill is frowned upon and the use of charcoal is accepted, but wood is seen as the most effective method to cook the meat.

It is expected that people attending a braai bring snacks, drinks, and other meat to eat until the main meal has finished cooking on the grill. This potluck-like activity is known as "bring and braai". Cooking on the braai is a bonding experience for fathers and sons, while women prepare salads and other side dishes in kitchens or other areas away from the grill. Examples of meat prepared for a braai are lamb, steaks, spare ribs, sausages, chicken, and fish. Mielie pap, also known as "Krummel pap", is a crumbled cornmeal often served as a side dish.

== Techniques ==
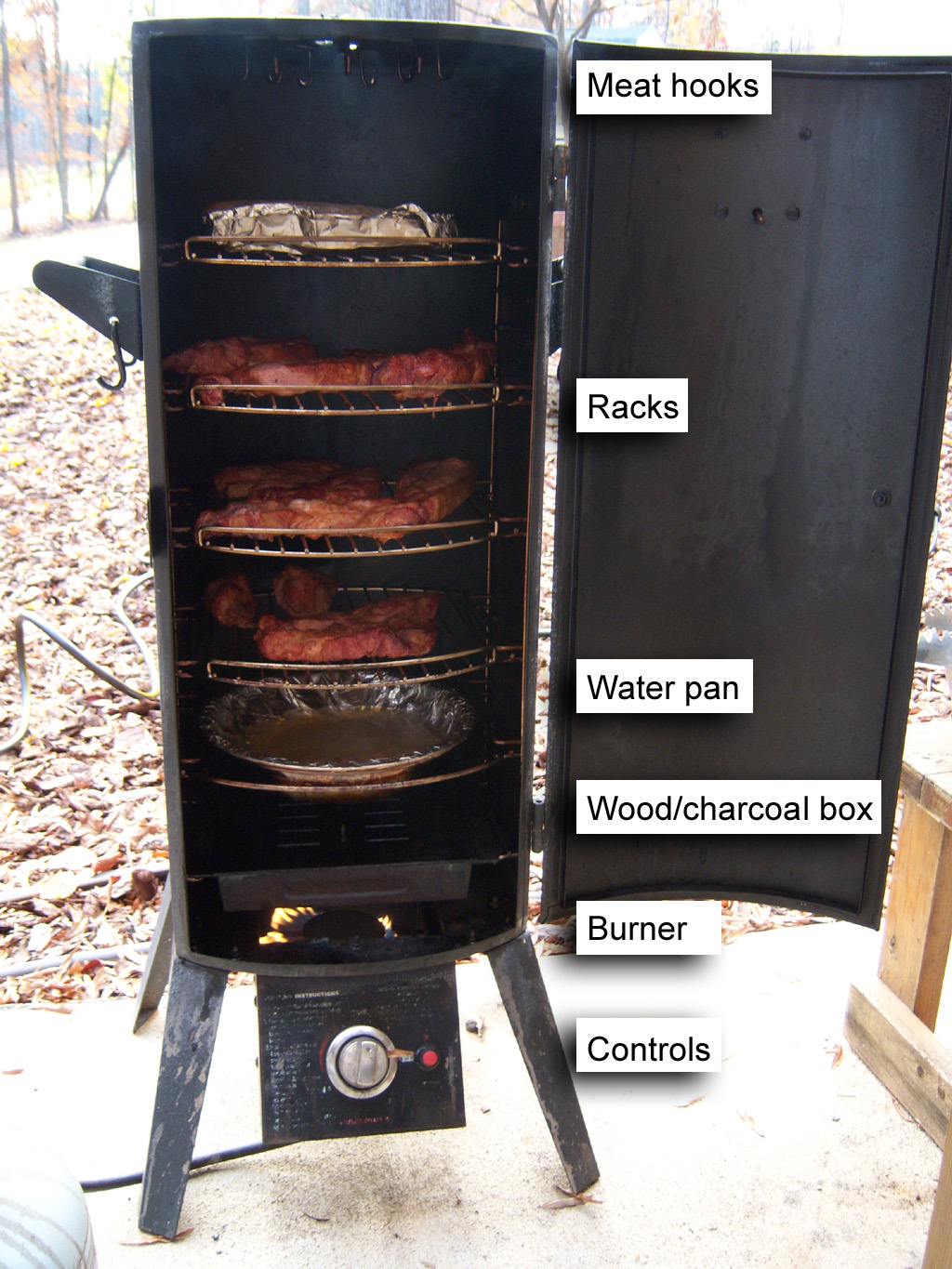
Diagram of a propane smoker used for barbecuing

Known as smoking, the original technique is cooking using smoke around 116–138 °C (240–280 °F), and longer cooking times.

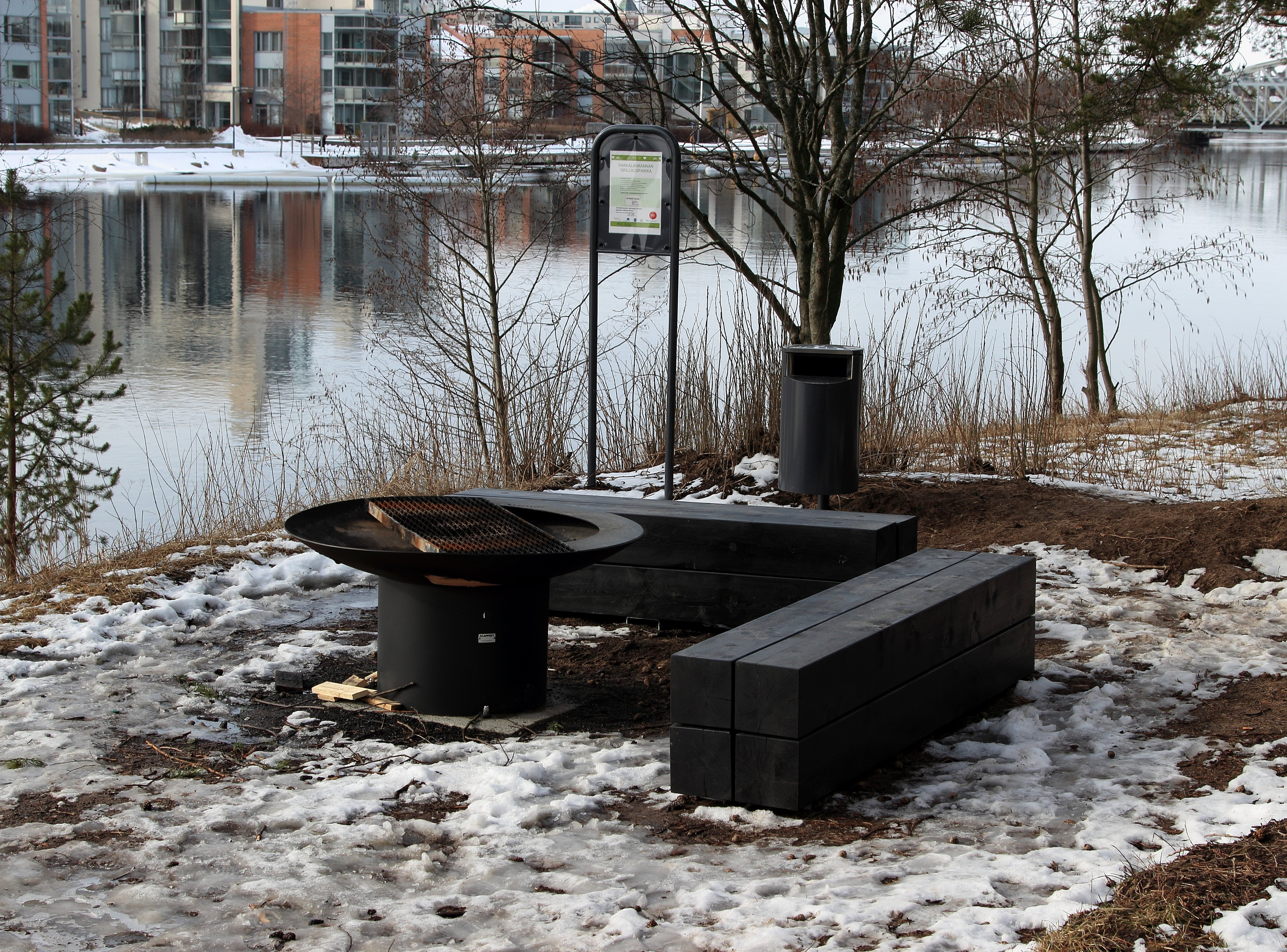
A public barbecue site at a park in Oulu, Finland, on 23 March 2014

Grilling is done over direct, dry heat, usually over a hot fire over 260 °C (500 °F) for a few minutes. Grilling and smoking are done with wood, charcoal, gas, electricity, or pellets. The time difference between smoking and grilling is because of the temperature difference; at low temperatures used for smoking, meat takes several hours to reach the desired internal temperature.

=== Smoking ===
Smoking is the process of flavoring, cooking, and/or preserving food by exposing it to smoke from burning or smoldering material, most often wood. Meat and fish are the most common smoked foods, though cheeses, vegetables, nuts, and ingredients used to make beverages such as beer or smoked beer are also smoked.

=== Grilling ===
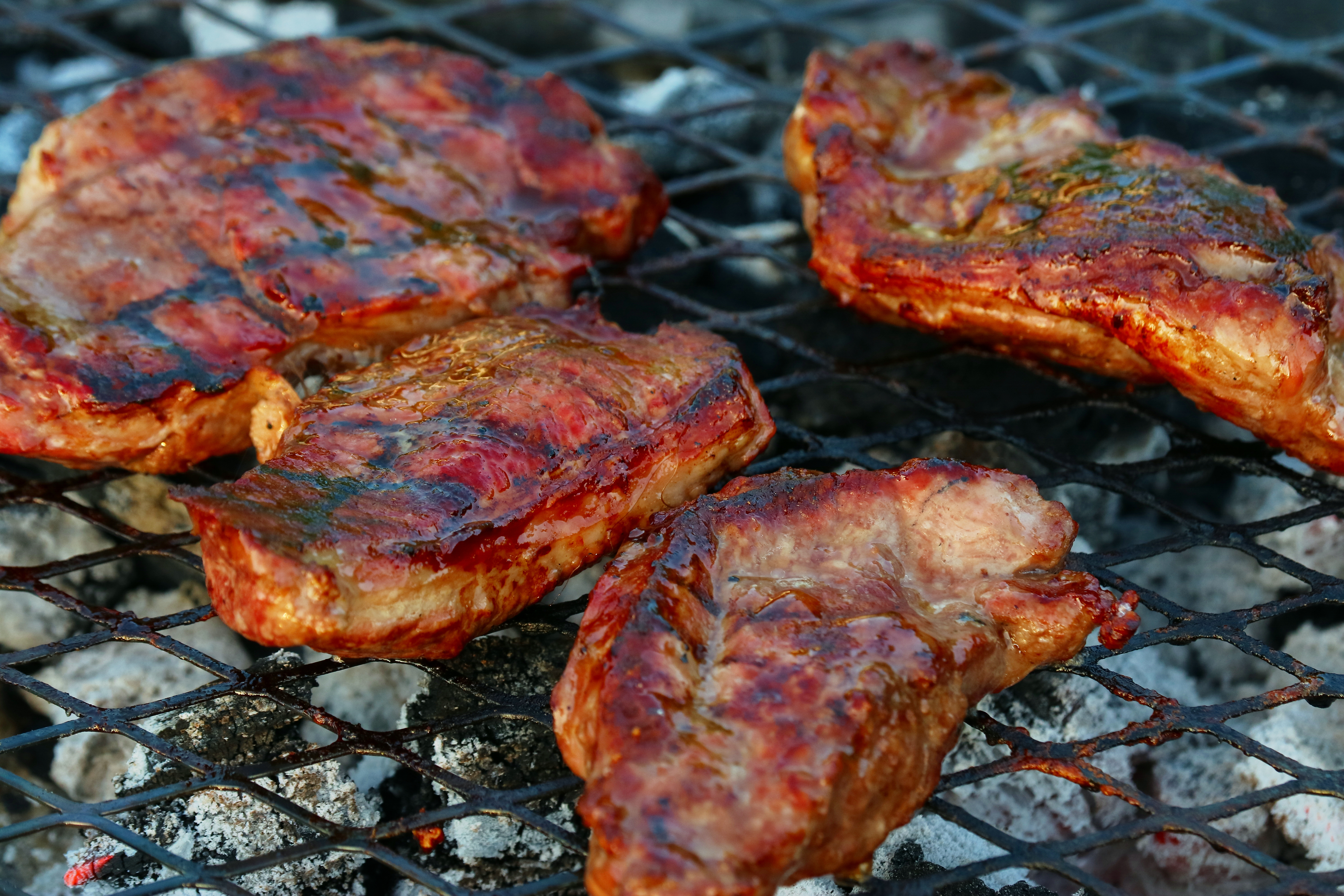
Lamb grilling over hot coals

Grilling is a form of cooking involving dry heat applied to the food, either from above or below. Grilling is a fast and effective technique in order to cook meat or vegetables since it involves a large amount of direct, radiant heat. Outside of the US, this is the most common technique when cooking classic barbecue foods, although some variants of grilling require direct, but moderate heat.

The words "barbecue" and "grilling" are often used interchangeably, although some argue barbecue is a type of grilling, and that grilling involves the use of a higher level of heat to sear the food, while barbecuing is a slower process over a low heat.

In practice, it is hard to define low temperature and high temperature because of barbecue cooks cooking meats at higher temperatures, rather than was traditional.

== Other uses ==
The term barbecue is also used to designate a flavor added to food items, the most prominent of which are potato chips.

== See also ==
- List of barbecue dishes – Distinct food types generally cooked using the specific method
- List of barbecue restaurants
- List of smoked foods
- Regional variations of barbecue
  - Asado – Barbecue style in various South American countries
  - Braai, South Africa
  - Churrasco – Portuguese and Spanish name for beef or grilled meat, Brazil
  - Korean barbecue – Regional style of food preparation
  - Memphis-style barbecue – Regional style of food preparation in the United States
  - Mongolian barbecue – Stir-fried dish
  - Nyama choma – Grilled goat meat, Kenya
  - Kansas City–style barbecue – Dish of slowly smoked meat
  - Kebab – Variety of meat dishes originating in the Middle East
  - Mangal – Middle Eastern barbecue
  - Mashawi
  - North Carolina barbecue – Regional style of food preparation in the United States
  - Satay – Southeast Asian form of kebab
  - Shaokao – Chinese term for barbecue
  - Siu mei – Cantonese roasted meat, Cantonese barbecued meat
  - South Carolina barbecue – Regional style of food preparation in the United States
  - Souvla – Cyprus skewered barbecue meat
  - St. Louis–style barbecue – Spare ribs dish
  - Texas Barbecue – Regional style of food preparation in the United States
  - Yakiniku – Korean-style grilled meat cuisine in Japan
- Barrel barbecue – Barbecue made from a 55-gallon barrel
- Buccan – Device for grilling
- Burnt ends – Barbecued meat delicacy
- Carne asada – Grilled and sliced beef
- Ribfest – Type of food festival that occurs throughout the United States and Canada
- Shashlik – Form of shish kebab
- Spice rub – Spices rubbed on food before cooking
- Teppanyaki – Style of Japanese cuisine
- Sausage sizzle – Sausage on bread
