= Whiggery =

Whiggery may mean:

- Whiggism, support for the principles of the British Whig Party of the late 17th, 18th and early 19th centuries
- Whig history, a philosophy of history emphasising inevitable progress
