= Worthington Enterprises =

U.S. metals manufacturing company

Worthington Enterprises, Inc.
- Type: Public company
- Traded as: NYSE: WOR
- Industry: Building products Consumer products
- Founded: 1955; 71 years ago
- Founder: John H. McConnell
- Headquarters: Columbus, Ohio, United States
- Number of locations: 14 locations
- Area served: Global
- Key people: Joseph Hayek (CEO)
- Brands: Amtrol, Amtrol-Alfa, Balloon Time, Bernzomatic, Coleman (propane cylinders), Elgen, Garden Weasel, General, HALO, LEVEL5 Tools, Mag Torch, Pactool International, Ragasco
- Revenue: $1.2 billion net sales (FY 2025)
- Number of employees: 6,000 (including joint ventures)
- Website: worthingtonenterprises.com

Worthington Enterprises, Inc. (formerly Worthington Industries) is an American industrial manufacturing company headquartered in Columbus, Ohio. The company is composed of two business segments, consumer products and building products. Within these segments, the company designs and manufactures pressure vessels such as propane, oxygen and helium tanks, refrigerant and industrial cylinders, camping and residential use cylinders, water system tanks for storage, treatment, heating, expansion and flow control, as well as a variety of retail products under several brand names.

== History ==
Worthington Industries was founded in 1955 by John H. McConnell, a steel salesman. McConnell saw an opportunity for custom-processed steel and purchased his first load of steel by borrowing $600 against his 1952 Oldsmobile. He founded the company in Columbus, Ohio, where it is still headquartered.

In his first year of business, McConnell grossed $342,000; his profit was $11,000. Throughout the late 1950s and 1960s, he continued to add processing facilities. In 1966, he started sharing his profits with the people he worked with. In 1968, Worthington Industries made its first public stock offering of 150,000 shares at $7.50 per share. Throughout the 1980s, the company continued to expand rapidly.

In 1996, John H. McConnell's son, John P. McConnell, took over as chairman and CEO. He had worked for the company for more than 20 years, having started as a general laborer and later advancing to sales, operations and personnel.

In 2000, Worthington Industries moved to the New York Stock Exchange.

In June 2017, the company acquired Amtrol for $283 million.

In 2022, the company announced its intent to spin off its steel processing business and split into two separate, publicly traded companies. On November 9, 2023, the separation was approved by the board of directors.

On December 1, 2023, Worthington Industries completed its planned separation into two companies: Worthington Enterprises and Worthington Steel.

In 2024, Worthington Enterprises acquired HALO, an outdoor cooking company that makes pizza ovens, griddles and pellet grills. In June, the company announced two transactions with Hexagon Composites in Norway: the partial sale of its sustainable energy solutions business to create a joint venture, and the complete purchase of Hexagon Ragasco, the composite cylinder division of Hexagon Composites.
