= Boucan =

Boucan may refer to:

- Boucan, a frame for drying meat over a fire, or the dried meat itself
- Boucan d'enfer, a studio album from French artist Renaud
- Boucan-Carré, is a commune in the Mirebalais arrondissement in the Centre department of Haiti
- Grand-Boucan, is a commune in the Baradères arrondissement in the Nippes department of Haiti
