= Kloeckner Metals Corporation =

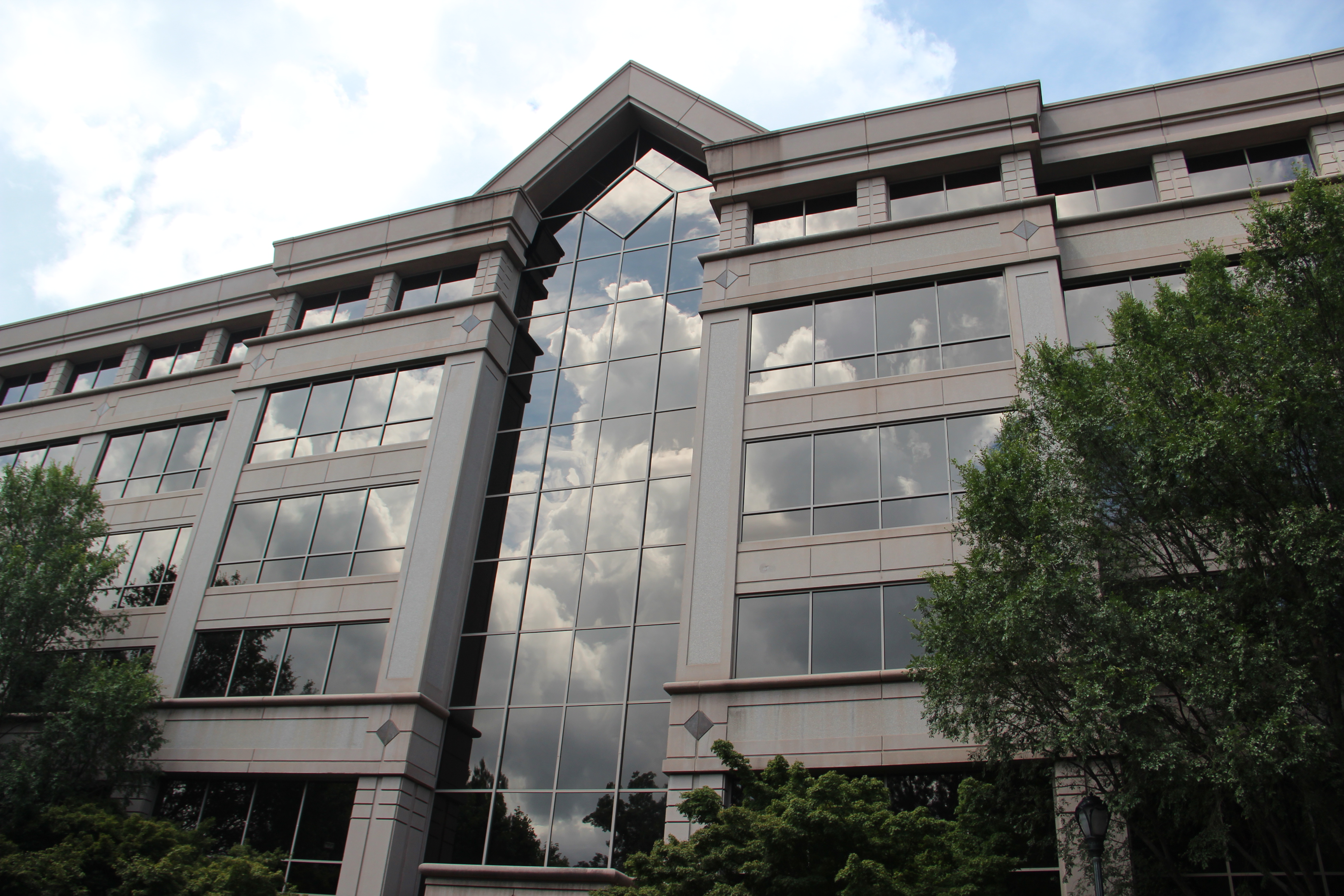
Kloeckner Metals Corporation offices in Roswell, Georgia

Kloeckner Metals Corporation is a steel and metal distributor based in Roswell, Georgia. Kloeckner Metals Corporation's core business is the sale of steel and non-ferrous metals. The North American subsidiary of Klöckner & Co SE, Kloeckner Metals Corporation is the fourth-largest service center company in North America with 50 locations in North America servicing 8,000 metalworking businesses in the United States, Puerto Rico, Mexico, and Canada. In 2016, Kloeckner Metals Corporation reported sales of $2.6 billion.

== History ==
Kloeckner Metals Corporation was founded in 2011 when subsidiaries Macsteel Service Centers USA and Namasco merged.

In 2015, Kloeckner Metals Corporation announced the acquisition of sheet metal fabrication company American Fabricators.

In 2017, Kloeckner Metals Corporation announced a new 106,000-square-foot plant in University Park, Illinois and the expansion of its flat-rolled distribution center in Greenville, South Carolina. The same year, Kloeckner Metals Corporation announced the appointment of John Ganem as CEO beginning January 1, 2017.

In 2023, Kloeckner Metals Corporation announced several acquisitions, including National Material of Mexico, a service center and materials supplier serving automotive and industrial end markets in North America with ten facilities in Mexico; Sol Components, an end-to-end structural solution provider for the commercial and utility solar sectors; and Industrial Manufacturing Services, a metal fabricated component manufacturer serving OEMs in the heavy machinery industry.

== Digitalization ==
Kloeckner Metals Corporation has publicly shared a major commitment to the digitalization of the metals industry at large.

== Awards ==
- In 2017, Kloeckner Metals Corporation was rated a top workplace by the Atlanta Journal-Constitution.
- In 2017, Kloeckner Metals Corporation's departing CEO, Bill Partalis, was named Executive of the Year by Metal Center News.
- In 2018, Kloeckner Metals Corporation was rated a top workplace by the Atlanta Journal-Constitution.
- In 2019, Kloeckner Metals Corporation was rated a top workplace by the Atlanta Journal-Constitution.
- In 2024, Kloeckner Metals Corporation was rated a top workplace by USA Today.
