= Memphis Wood Fire Grills =

North American manufacturing company

Memphis Wood Fire Grills LLC
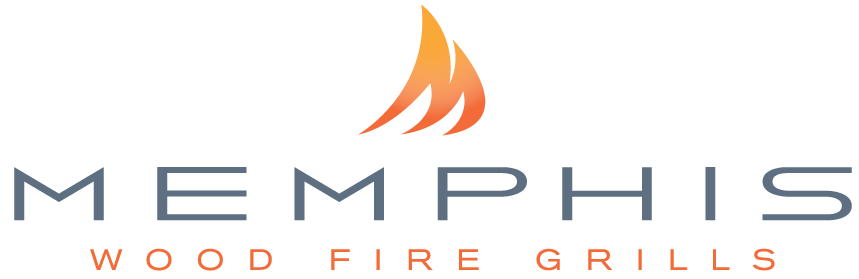

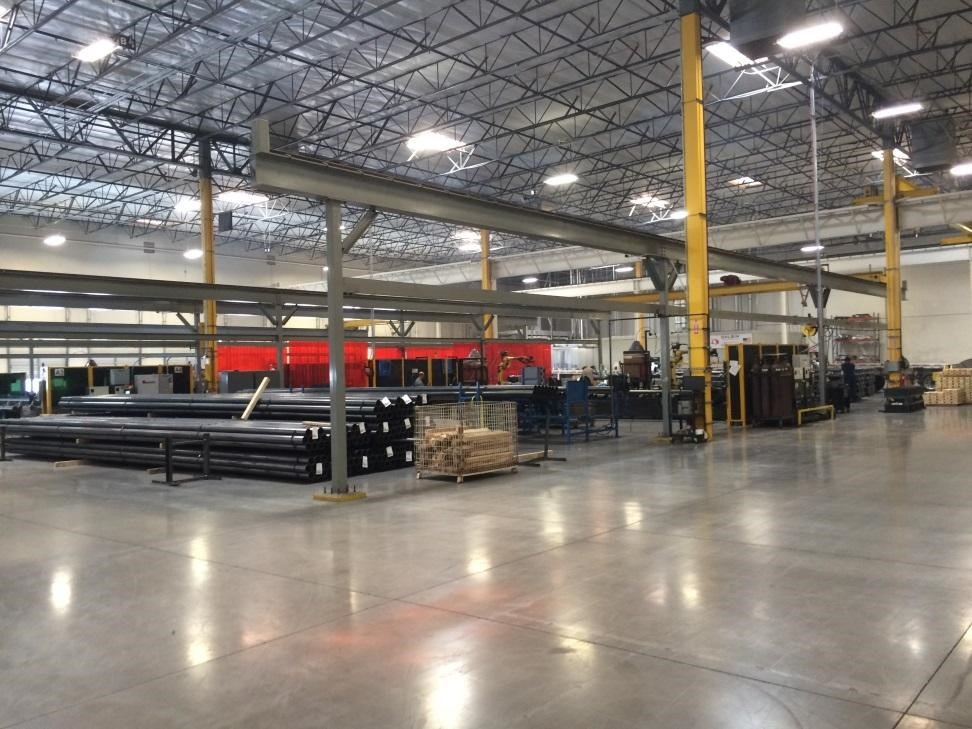
- Dalsin's 135,000 square foot manufacturing facility
- Type: Private
- Industry: Manufacturing
- Founded: 2009; 17 years ago
- Headquarters: Bloomington, Minnesota, United States
- Products: Outdoor Pellet Grills
- Parent: Dalsin Industries
- Website: memphisgrills.com

Memphis Wood Fire Grills is a North American privately held manufacturer of pellet grills and food-grade hardwood pellets. Memphis has an international presence in the United States, Canada, Germany, and Norway.

== History ==
Memphis Wood Fire Grills first introduced a line of high-end pellet grills in 2010. The company is wholly owned by Dalsin Industries, a precision sheet metal fabrication company based in Bloomington, Minnesota.

Memphis Wood Fire Grills LLC has differentiated itself as a premium pellet grill brand, striving for versatility and a superior outdoor cooking experience. In addition to producing high-end pellet grills, Memphis also manufactures 100% natural hardwood BBQ pellets to be used on any pellet grill.

== Grills ==
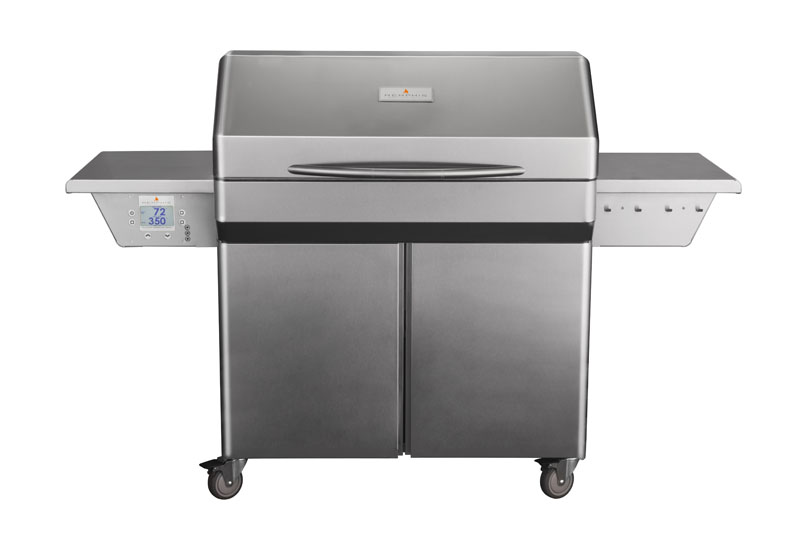
The Memphis Elite Wood Pellet Grill

In an attempt to combine the best attributes of a real wood fire, a convection oven, a high-end gas grill, and a smoker, Memphis created a grill that uses 100 percent natural wood pellets. The grills have an intelligent temperature control panel that is used to set exact temperatures based on cooking needs. Between the different models, the grills have a recorded range of 180–700 °F, the highest of which can be achieved through an open-flame insert.

In 2016, Memphis began selling grills with large LCD screens that have integrated wi-fi temperature control and a free app. These grills come with a direct flame insert and a meat temperature probe.

== Partnerships ==
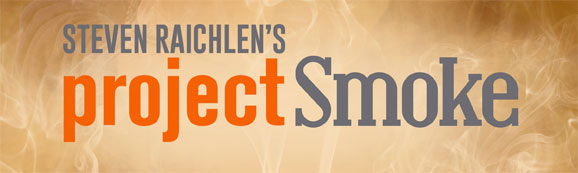
Project Smoke

In his cooking show Project Smoke, Steven Raichlen took a look at the many options a person has when barbecuing and smoking, and was particularly interested in the Memphis Grill. He has described the Memphis Wood Fire Grill as, "the Tesla of pellet grills, with sophisticated electronics to control cooking temperature and smoke output and even check the doneness of your reverse seared tri-tip or turkey. My favorite feature (besides the convenience)? A removable burn chamber cover plate you can remove so you can actually direct grill over the pellet fire."

Steven has worked with Memphis to develop dishes and new techniques for its pellet grills.

Andrew Zimmern, of the Travel Channel's Bizarre Foods with Andrew Zimmern, has also partnered with Memphis. In 2014 Zimmern hosted a giveaway that featured the Memphis Wood Fire Pro, a grill he keeps in his own backyard.

== Recognition ==
In 2010, Memphis was awarded the Vesta Award by Hearth & Home magazine, naming it the Best In Show for Outdoor Products. In 2015, KüchenInnovation announced Memphis as among the best of the best in outdoor kitchen function, innovation, design, and sustainability.

The Memphis Pro has been featured in Wired as the perfect combination of charcoal grill flavor, and gas grill reliability. Forbes, in their BBQ Grills buyers guide, called the Memphis, "the best one, and not only can do it all, but can do it all really well, a true all in one gourmet outdoor solution."
