= Guido Kerkhoff =

German business executive

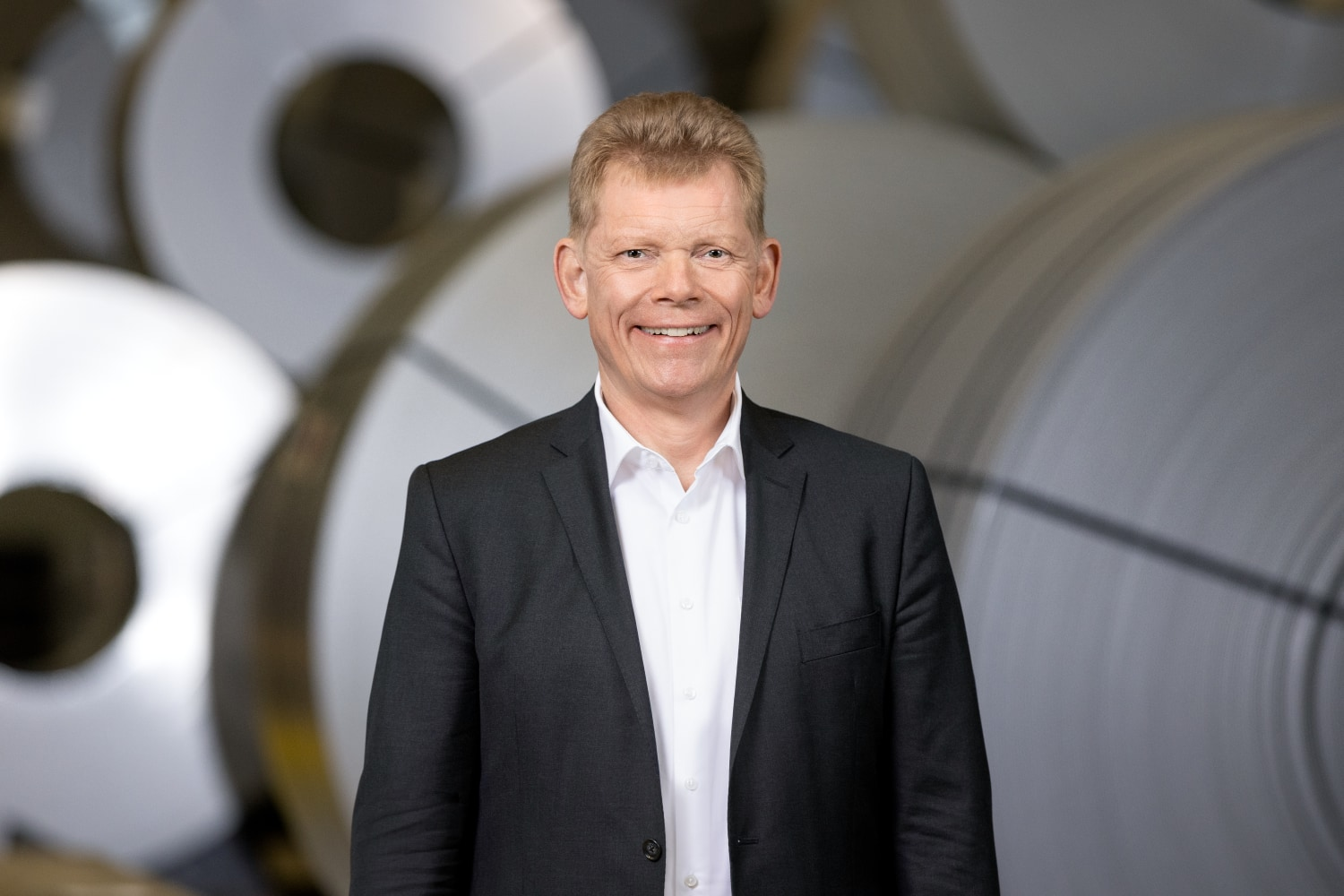
- Guido Kerkhoff, 2023
- Born: November 22, 1967 (age 58); Schüttorf, Germany
- Education: Bielefeld University; Saarland University
- Occupation: Business executive (CEO/CFO)
- Employer: Klöckner & Co
- Known for: Transformation of steel and metal industry

Guido Kerkhoff (born November 22, 1967, in Schüttorf) is a German business executive. He has been chairman of the Management Board of Klöckner & Co since 2021. During his tenure, the steel and metal distributor has expanded its existing product and service portfolio to include CO_{2}-reduced steel and metal solutions. Prior to joining Klöckner & Co, Kerkhoff held various management positions at Thyssenkrupp, including chairman of the management board. He has also worked for Deutsche Telekom, Bertelsmann, and VEW.

== Life and education ==
Kerkhoff studied business administration at the Bielefeld University and the Saarland University.

Kerkhoff is married and has two children. He lives in Essen, Germany.

== Career ==
After completing his studies, Kerkhoff worked in corporate accounting at VEW (Vereinigte Elektrizitätswerke Westfalen) from 1995 to 1996. The company is now part of the RWE Group.

From 1996 to 2002, Kerkhoff worked at Bertelsmann, where he served as Head of Projects and Policy in the accounting and controlling department.

=== Deutsche Telekom ===
In 2002, Kerkhoff joined Deutsche Telekom, where he held various management positions in the finance department. From 2006 to 2011, he was responsible for group accounting and group controlling, initially as Head of Corporate Center. In 2009, he was promoted to the Board of Management of Deutsche Telekom, where he was initially responsible for activities in Southern and Eastern Europe and, from 2010 onwards, for the entire European business outside Germany.

=== Thyssenkrupp ===
Starting in April 2011, Kerkhoff served as chief financial officer of Thyssenkrupp. Subsequently, following the resignation of Heinrich Hiesinger as Chairman of the Executive Board, Kerkhoff was appointed as his successor in July 2018. He served in this position until September 2019. His tenure was marked by portfolio restructuring against a backdrop of intense competition.

=== Klöckner & Co ===
In July 2020, Kerkhoff joined the Management Board of Klöckner & Co, one of the world’s largest producer-independent distributors of steel and metal products. As Deputy Chairman of the management board, Kerkhoff was responsible for the Group's European business. At the end of the Annual General Meeting in May 2021, he succeeded Gisbert Rühl as Chairman of the Management Board. In October 2023, Kerkhoff's responsibilities were expanded in connection with the reorganization of the management board.

During his tenure, Klöckner & Co revised its strategy. The merging of the company’s digital and physical business processes continued, and the company’s portfolio was optimized to focus on higher-value business, including processing and fabrication services. Additionally, Kerkhoff set new priorities in the German-speaking DACH markets and in North America.

As a result of the group strategy introduced by Kerkhoff, sustainability topics received increased attention. In this context, Klöckner & Co developed its first dedicated sustainability strategy. Concrete examples of measures resulting from the strategy include the expansion of the product and service portfolio to include CO_{2}-reduced steel and metal solutions such as green steel, and the development of AI-based applications for the evaluation of CO_{2} emissions.
