= Barrel barbecue =

Barbecue made from a 55-gallon barrel

A barrel barbecue is a type of barbecue stove made from a 55-gallon drum barrel. Vents are cut into the top and bottom for airflow control. A lid is used to retain heat. A chimney is not needed because the length of the barrel acts as its own chimney and provides a draft. Short horseshoe-like legs are attached for stability.

== Gallery ==
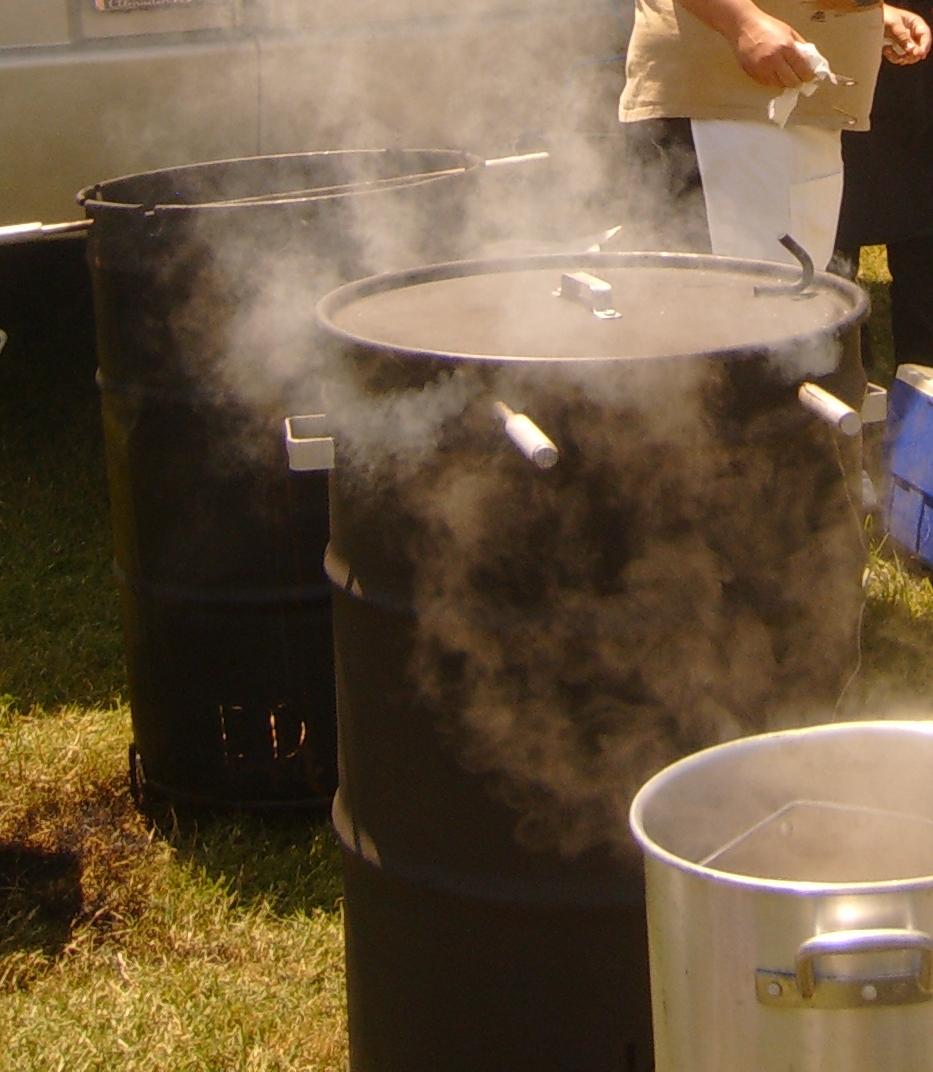
Barrel Barbecue

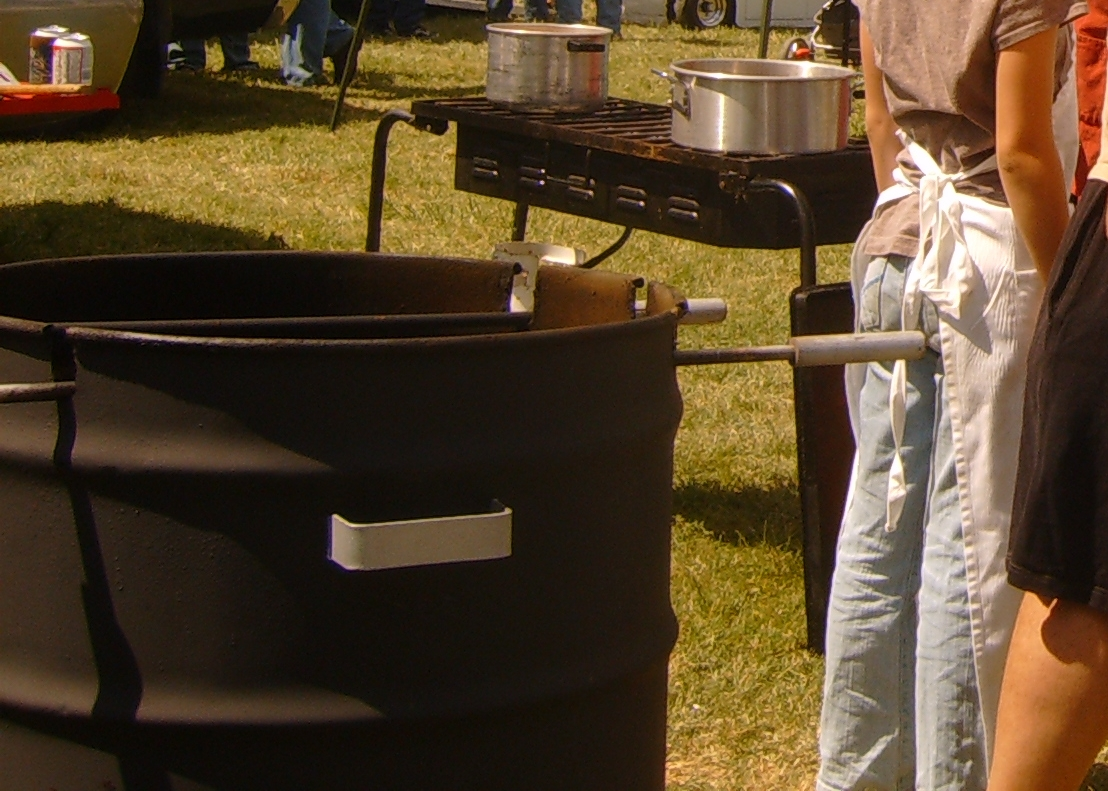
Barrel Barbecue different view

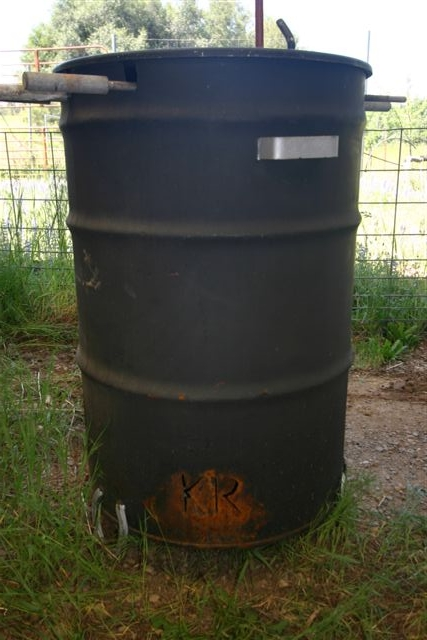
Barrel Barbecue tall view

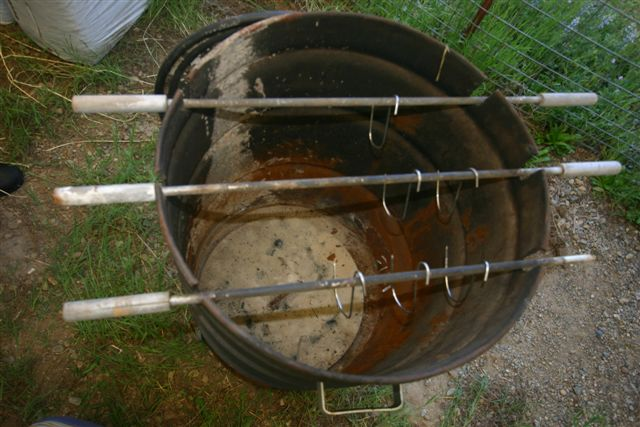
Barrel Barbecue top view

== See also ==
- Beverage can stove
