= Bopfingen =

- Town
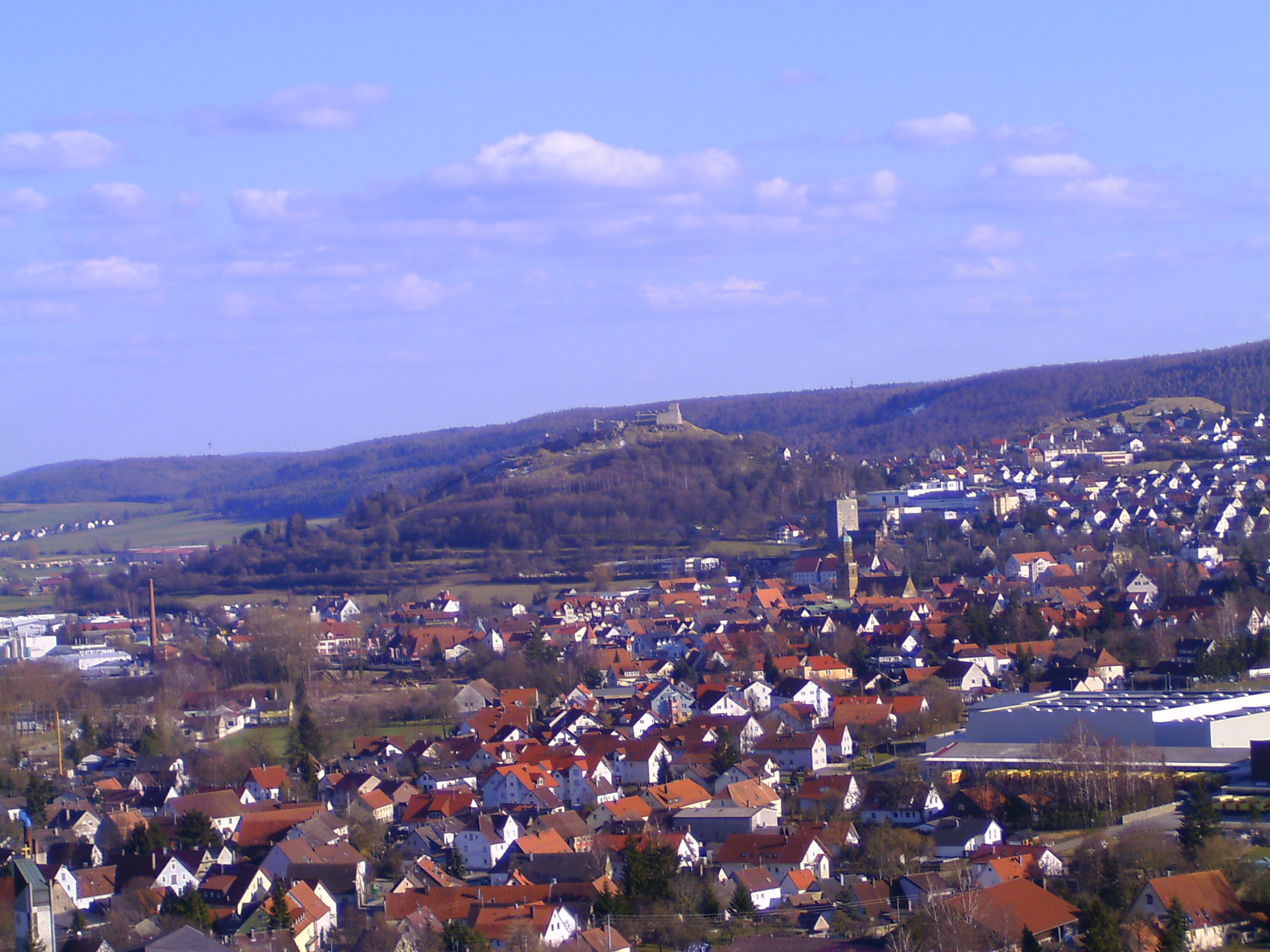

- Coat of arms

- Location of Bopfingen within Ostalbkreis district
- Interactive map of Bopfingen
- Location within Germany Location within Baden-Württemberg
- Coordinates: 48°51′25″N 10°21′8″E
- Country: Germany
- State: Baden-Württemberg
- Admin. region: Stuttgart
- District: Ostalbkreis
- Subdivisions: 9 Stadtteile

Government
  - Mayor (2021–29): Dr Gunter Bühler

Area
  - Total: 76.96 km^{2} (29.71 sq mi)
- Elevation: 468 m (1,535 ft)

Population (2025-12-31)
  - Total: 11,531
  - Density: 149.8/km^{2} (388.1/sq mi)
- Time zone: UTC+01:00 (CET)
  - Summer (DST): UTC+02:00 (CEST)
- Postal codes: 73441
- Dialling codes: 07362
- Vehicle registration: AA
- Website: www.bopfingen.de

Bopfingen (German pronunciation: [ˈbɔpfɪŋən]; Swabian: Bopfeng) is a small city in Baden-Württemberg, Germany. It is situated in the Ostalbkreis, between Aalen and Nördlingen. It consists of the city Bopfingen itself and its suburbs Aufhausen, Baldern, Flochberg, Kerkingen, Oberdorf, Schloßberg, Trochtelfingen, and Unterriffingen. Bopfingen is famous for its landmark Ipf, a table mountain which forms part of the northeastern end of the Schwäbische Alb. To the east lies Bavaria and the meteor crater Nördlinger Ries.

The first known settlers came to the area 8000 years ago in the Holocene. Also Celtic and Roman relics were found. It was first mentioned between 775 and 850 AD in a deed of foundation of "Traditiones Fuldenses" where it was called "Pophingen".

== Mayors ==
Since February 2006 Gunter Bühler is the mayor of Bopfingen. Bühler is an economic geographer. Previous mayors:

- Wilhelm Haas: 1840-1876
- Wilhelm Dörr 1877-1899
- Adolf Bergmüller: 1900-1903
- Eugen Enslin: 1903-1936
- Hans Ellinger: 1936-1945
- Paul Merz: 1945-1947
- Hans Ellinger: 1954-1973
- Erich Göttlicher: 1973-1998
- Bernhard Rapp: 1998-2006

== Notable people ==
- Wilhelm Meyder (1841-1927), born in Oberdorf am Ipf, Schultheiss (mayor) and Member of Landtag
- Heinrich Hiesinger (born 1960), industrial manager, since January 21, 2011 Chairman of the management board of ThyssenKrupp AG

== Sport ==
- The Kartbahn or Breitwangbahn is a permanent motorsport racing track for karting and is located about 2 km west of the town center. It was the former site of the Bopfingen Speedway, a motorcycle speedway track from 30 July 1972, which hosted significant events, including qualifying rounds of the Speedway World Championship in 1977 and 1981 and a qualifying round of the Speedway World Team Cup in 1974. The track hosted a team called MSC Ipf Bopfingen from 1972 to 1984 and who were West German champions in 1974.
