= Aufhausen (Bopfingen) =

Borough in Germany

- Borough
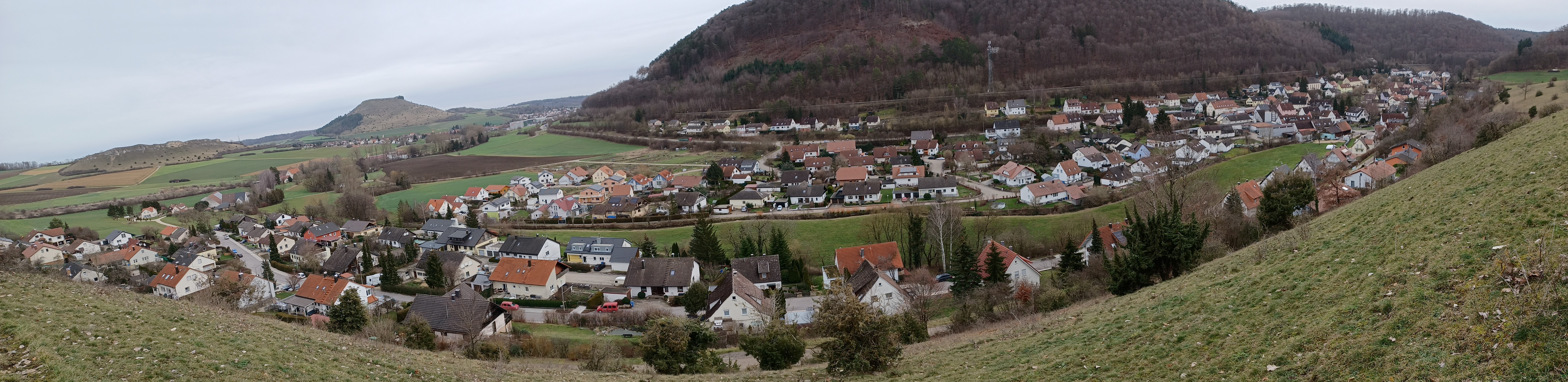
- Aufhausen from the northwest

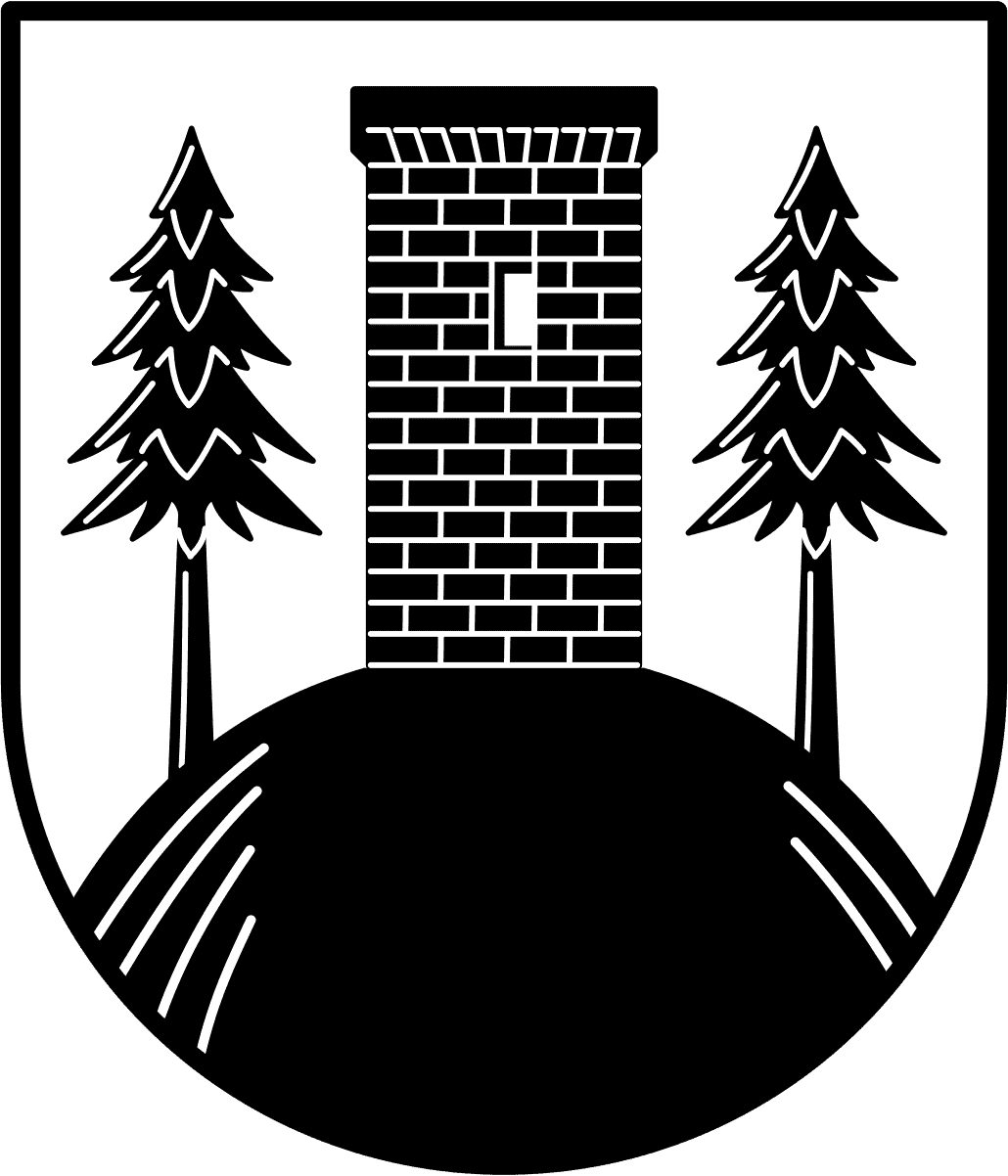
- Coat of arms

- Location within Baden-Württemberg Location within Germany
- Coordinates: 48°51′38″N 10°19′12″E
- Country: Germany
- State: Baden-Württemberg
- Admin. Region: Stuttgart
- Region: Ostwürttemberg
- District: Ostalbkreis
- Village: Bopfingen
- Elevation: 487 m (1,598 ft)

Population
  - Total: 831
- Postal code: 73441

Aufhausen is a borough and a suburb of the town of Bopfingen in the Ostalbkreis district of Baden-Württemberg in Germany. The hamlets of Bayermühle and Michelfeld and the houses Schlägweidmühle and Walkmühle belong to the village. Aufhausen was an independent municipality until it merged with Bopfingen. The borough has about 831 inhabitants.

== Geography ==
Aufhausen, also known as the "village of mills", is located west of Bopfingen, directly on the Bundesstraße B 29. The village lies elongated in the Eger valley, only slightly below the karst source of the Eger, where the Schenkenbach valley meets, and is overlooked by the rocky forested heights of the northern Härtsfeld.

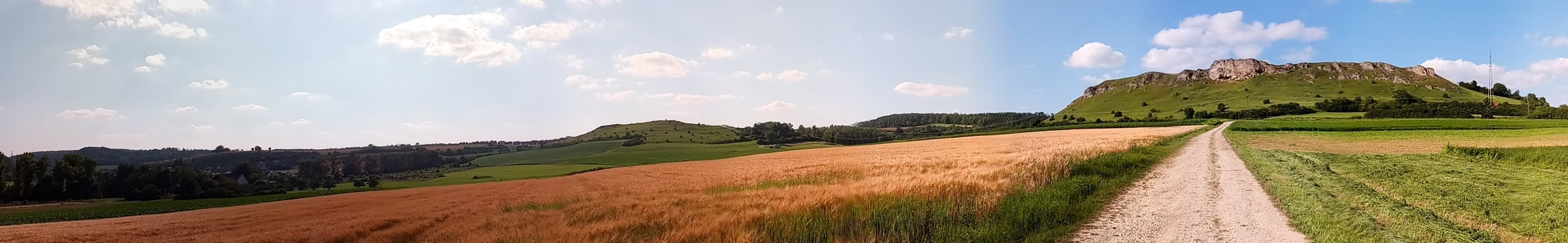

In the area that extends north of Aufhausen, there lies a nature reserve, which includes the elevations Tonnenberg, Käsbühl and Karkstein.

Aufhausen also has a station on the Stuttgart-Bad Cannstatt–Nördlingen railway, which is located on the hillside near the Schenkenstein castle ruins and the Jewish cemetery.

== History ==
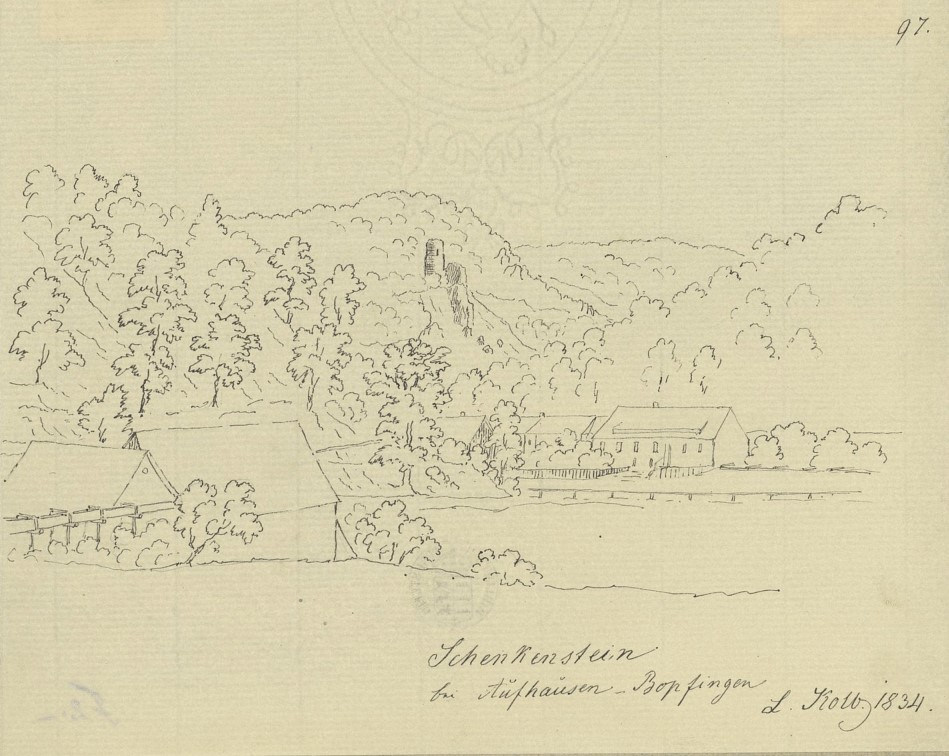
View of Aufhausen with the ruin Schenkenstein (Ludwig Kolb 1834)

Aufhausen was first mentioned around 1136 as Ufhusen, the place was an accessory of the castle Schenkenstein. The suffix -hausen of the place name indicates that the place was settled in the older period of expansion (7th to 10th century).

After the Schenken died out, the Schenkenstein dominion passed to their heirs, the von Gundelsheim family. They sold the dominion in 1613 to the County of Oettingen, which also acquired the Ansbach fiefs and in 1750 those of the Ellwangen Abbey.

In 1806 Aufhausen came to the Kingdom of Bavaria, in 1810 the village was annexed to the Kingdom of Württemberg. Since 1975 Aufhausen has been a district of Bopfingen.
