= Klöckner & Co =

Steel and metal distribution company

Klöckner & Co SE
- Type: Public (Societas Europaea)
- Traded as: FWB: KCO; SDAX
- ISIN: DE000KC01000
- Industry: Steel and metal distribution
- Founded: 1906 in Duisburg, Germany
- Founders: Peter Klöckner; Florian Klöckner
- Headquarters: Düsseldorf, Germany
- Key people: Guido Kerkhoff (Chairman of the Management Board, CEO); Oliver Falk (Member of the Management Board, CFO); John Ganem (Member of the Management Board, CEO Americas); Dieter H. Vogel (Chairman of the Supervisory Board)
- Revenue: €6,380 million (2025)
- Number of employees: 6,500 (2025)
- Website: www.kloeckner.com

Klöckner & Co SE (also known as Klöckner, KlöCo, or KCO) is a producer-independent processor of steel and metal products. With a network of 110 warehousing and processing locations, Klöckner & Co supplies over 60,000 customers, mainly in Europe and North America.

The company was founded in 1906 by Peter Klöckner as a trading company and has subsequently developed into one of the world's leading steel distributors. Klöckner & Co has been listed on the Frankfurt Stock Exchange since 2006. In recent years, Klöckner & Co has driven the integration of digital technologies into its core business and expanded its offering to include sustainable products, including green steel. The company is increasingly focusing on higher value-added business and is expanding its offering accordingly.

== History ==
=== Foundation and early years ===
On June 28, 1906, the businessman Peter Klöckner, together with his brother Florian Klöckner, founded Klöckner & Co as a general partnership company in Duisburg. Born in Koblenz in 1863, Peter Klöckner had worked in the iron and steel industry for 24 years by the time the company was founded, having previously made a name for himself through business restructuring and investments. Klöckner & Co was founded as a trading company to strategically cater to the growing iron and steel industry. In addition to acquisitions, Klöckner focused on expansion from the beginning.

When the company was founded in 1906, the first branches were opened in Cologne and Düsseldorf. Klöckner & Co opened additional branches in Berlin and Magdeburg in 1907, followed by Hamburg and Dresden in 1909. In 1911, a branch was opened in Mannheim to cover the southwest of Germany and to link up with the company's production site in Kneuttingen, Lorraine. Klöckner & Co's extensive trading and distribution network made it necessary for the branches to be given the status of independent companies, operating on their own account with their own managers. In addition to pig iron trading and steel production, the product range was expanded to include ore trading and raw material processing.

Following the integration of the branches in Troisdorf and Düsseldorf, the group's companies covered the entire range of industrial production in Germany. The trading company served as an intermediary in the production chain, which, as early as 1912, extended from ore mining to the manufacturing of wires and machines. In 1913, the company entered the scrap trade, which developed into an exceptionally lucrative iron and steel trade branch.

=== During the First World War ===
The outbreak of the First World War marked a sharp turning point. The conscription of many employees for military service caused a significant labor shortage. Klöckner & Co's plant in Kneuttingen, drastically reduced production during the war years because many of the Italians who had worked there had to return to their home country when the war broke out. During the economic crisis following the end of the First World War, Klöckner & Co compensated for its losses in the steel business by expanding the company's fields of activity.

=== Klöckner & Co between the world wars ===
In the 1920s and 1930s, the trading company established its foreign department and opened its first branches in Europe, as well as in South and North America. The separation of the group into Klöckner-Werke and Klöckner & Co also strengthened the trading division's independence.

=== The time of National Socialism ===
After the death in December 1936 of Peter Klöckner's only son, Waldemar Peter Klöckner, the Peter Klöckner Family Foundation, which had been established in 1931, was appointed as heir to the Klöckner group of companies. The designated successor then became the husband of Peter Klöckner's stepdaughter, Günther Henle, a partner at Klöckner & Co from 1937 to 1976.

After Peter Klöckner's death on October 5, 1940, Günther Henle took over the management of the group of companies. As Klöckner & Co was regarded as one of the strategically essential companies for the German defense industry, the National Socialists took control of the company during the Second World War. Henle, who was removed from his position as managing director of the Klöckner group by the Nazis in 1942, took over the management of Klöckner & Co.

As early as the summer of 1940, forced laborers and concentration camp prisoners were deployed to work at Klöckner-Werke sites and their associated mines. Until 1945, 1,000 to 2,000 people were held prisoner in a camp at Werne Colliery. In Hasbergen-Ohrbeck near Osnabrück, the Gestapo set up a labor education camp, which probably held over 2000 prisoners who were forced to work in the nearby Klöckner plants.

Some of the plants were partially destroyed during the Second World War.

=== Reconstruction of the company ===
After the Second World War, the Klöckner & Co group was placed under the supervision of the Allies, whose aim was to unbundle the large company. Thus, a new start was made. Like the other Klöckner & Co companies, the trading company benefited from the global demand for iron and steel that soon set in. After the legal separation from the Klöckner-Werke AG and Klöckner-Humboldt-Deutz AG in the 1950s, Klöckner & Co developed into a diversified trading company. The sale of steel in Germany brought high profits during the "Wirtschaftswunder" ("Economic Miracle"), as Germany rapidly reconstructed and developed following WWII. Branches abroad strengthened international business. Klöckner & Co also became active in other sectors, such as shipping and burner technology.

Klöckner & Co responded to the end of the Wirtschaftswunder with more service, a reorganization, and more international trading activities. In addition to the core steel trading business, the company expanded into other trading areas. Diversification and internationalization helped to insulate the company during the economic ups and downs of the 1970s and 1980s. However, a failed crude oil futures transaction in the late 1980s plunged the company into an existential crisis. This drastically reduced the company's capital base by 600 million Deutsche Mark. Due to his responsibility for this division, Peter Henle left the company's management.

Deutsche Bank, which provided 400 million deutschmarks to cover the losses, took over the company and converted it into a stock corporation. This meant that Klöckner & Co was no longer family-run. During the rescue measures, the traditional company became the property of VIAG. Under new management, Klöckner & Co was active during the 1990s in steel, PC products, chemicals, textiles, and mobile buildings while also expanding its international presence in the steel sector.

In spring 1997, Klöckner & Co announced its decision to concentrate on its core business: steel and metal trading. While continuing to expand its stockholding steel trading in Europe, the group divested activities that were no longer part of its core business.

In 2001, Klöckner & Co was sold to the Balli Group, a British materials trader. The Iranian owners of Balli took over the group for around €1.1 billion. Two years after the takeover, Balli sold 94.5% of Klöckner & Co to WestLB and 5.1% to Hamburgische Landesbank.

=== Initial public offering ===
In 2005, Klöckner & Co was sold to the U.S. private equity firm Lindsay Goldberg & Bessemer (LGB), which floated the company on the stock exchange in June 2006 and sold most of the shares in October. The shares are admitted to trading on the Frankfurt Stock Exchange regulated market with additional post-admission obligations (Prime Standard). On January 29, 2007, Klöckner & Co shares were included in Deutsche Börse's MDAX index. The share has been listed in the SDAX since March 21, 2016. The share is listed under the ticker symbol KCO.

=== Development post-IPO ===
Particularly in the first few years after the IPO, Klöckner pursued an expansive acquisition strategy and took over several companies. In April 2007, Klöckner acquired the steel distribution company Primary-Steel. In 2008, Klöckner & Co acquired its US competitor Temtco Steel in 2008. In 2009, Becker Stahl-Service (BSS) and Bläsi were acquired. In 2011, Macsteel Service Centers USA and Frefer, Brazil's third-largest steel and metal distributor, became part of the group. This was followed by the acquisition of the Swiss reinforcement steel specialist Riedo Bau + Stahl in 2014. In 2015, Klöckner & Co acquired the American steel processor American Fabricators in Nashville, Tennessee.

In August 2008, Klöckner & Co was converted from a stock corporation under German law into a Societas Europaea (SE), a European legal form for stock corporations. In November 2009, Gisbert Rühl took over as Chairman of the Management Board from Thomas Ludwig. He initiated a restructuring of the company to compensate for declining demand. As a result, locations were closed or sold, and jobs were cut.

At the same time, the group invested in new technologies. Since 2014, the company has focused heavily on expanding digital sales channels. Today, the company is considered a pioneer in the industry with its Klöckner Assistant application and other digital services. The group enables other steel and metal trade companies to connect digitally without adapting their processes. In May 2017, the first part of the Becker Aluminium Service Center for processing flat aluminum products for the automotive and processing industry was put into operation in Bönen.

=== Most recent past ===
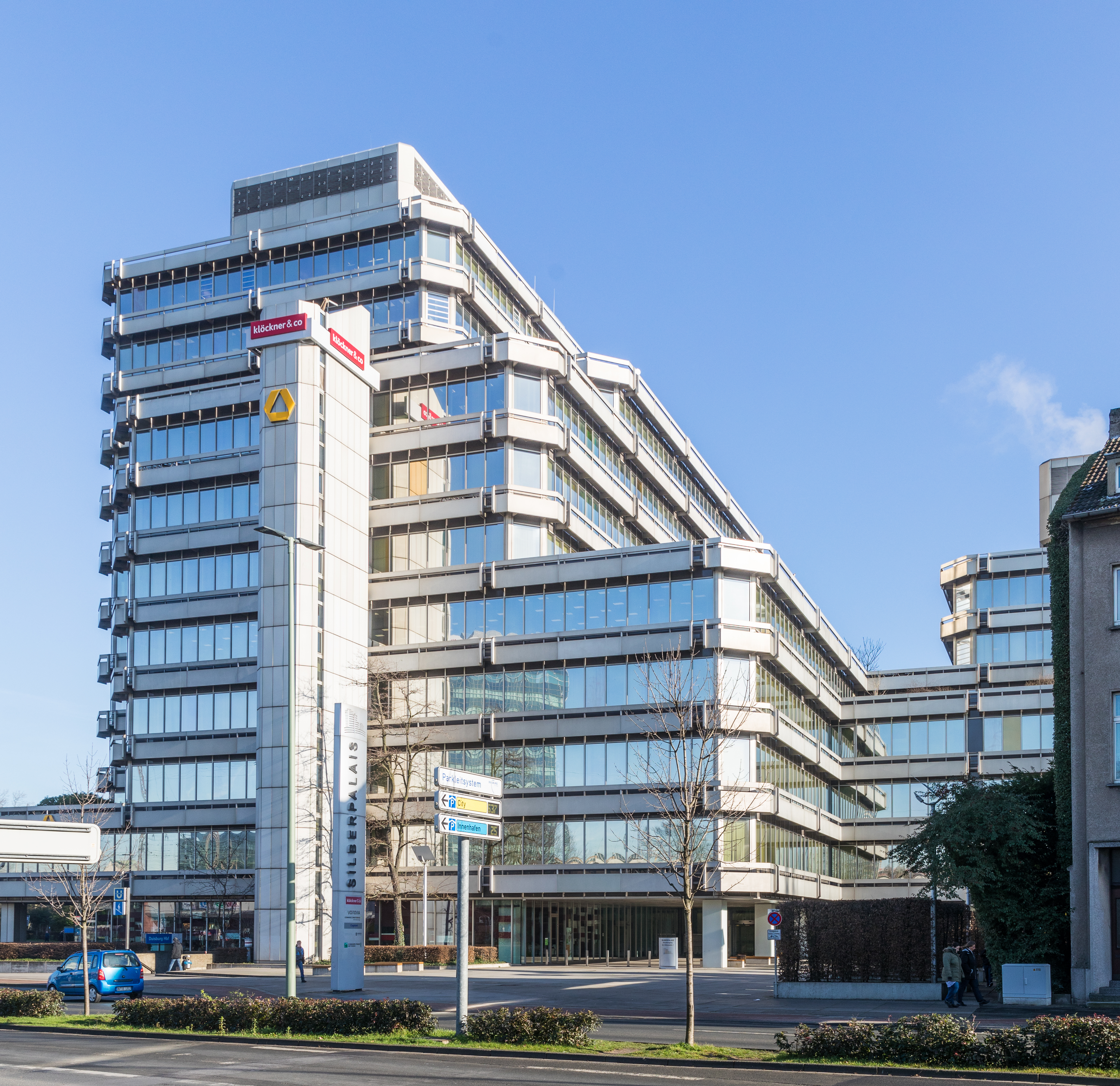
Former headquarters in Duisburg

In May 2021, Guido Kerkhoff succeeded Gisbert Rühl as Chairman of the Management Board of Klöckner & Co. Under his leadership, the group's sustainability strategy was further developed, and activities related to green steel were expanded.

Klöckner & Co has also focused on selective acquisitions, including Hernandez Stainless, RSC Rostfrei Coilcenter, National Materials of Mexico (NMM), Industrial Manufacturing Services (IMS), and Sol Components in recent years. These acquisitions are in line with the corporate strategy introduced by Guido Kerkhoff, which focuses on higher-value businesses, including the processing and metalworking business, in Europe and North America.

Additionally, as part of the portfolio optimization and the implementation of the corporate strategy, the company announced the planned sale of the distribution business in four European countries in December 2023. In March 2024, the national companies in France, the UK, the Netherlands, and Belgium were sold to the Spanish company Hierros Anon.

In 2025, Klöckner & Co relocated the group’s headquarters from Duisburg to Düsseldorf. In January 2026, the US competitor Worthington Steel announced its intention to acquire Klöckner.

== Corporate structure ==
=== Basic information ===
The group operates as a Societas Europaea (SE), a European legal form for stock corporations. The company's business is the distribution of steel and metal products, their processing, as well as the acquisition and management of investments of all kinds. The business activities are managed by the Executive Board and the central departments of the Duisburg Holding and are carried out by the national companies. The group is divided into two operating segments (Kloeckner Metals Europe and Kloeckner Metals Americas), under which other operating country organizations operate.

=== Shares and major shareholders ===
Klöckner & Co SE's share capital amounts to €249,375,000, which is divided into 99,750,000 no-par value registered shares. The company maintains a digital share register.

Since 2006, the KCO share has been traded on the regulated market (Prime Standard) of the Frankfurt Stock Exchange and is listed on the SDAX. This makes Klöckner & Co one of the 160 largest listed companies in Germany.

The major shareholders are: (as of mid-March 2026):

- Swoctem: 41.53 %
- Goldman Sachs: 8.26 %
- Worthington Steel: 7.79 %
- JPMorgan Chase: 4.80 %
- UBS: 3.77 %
- Dimensional Holdings: 3.01 %

=== Key figures ===
€ million	2019	2020	2021	2022	2023	2024	2025
sales	6,315	5,130	7,441	8,337	6,957	6,632	6,380
Profit (EBITDA)	139	52	879	407	190	109	152
Net income	-55	-114	629	213	0	-146	-53

== Business activities ==
Klöckner & Co has a dense distribution and service network with a geographical focus on Europe and North America.

=== Business model ===
The group's value chain extends from purchasing to warehousing, services, retail (digital and traditional), and distribution. Klöckner also offers consulting services relating to logistics and other production processes. The international distribution group operates independently of production. The group bundles its range of sustainable products and services, such as CO_{2}-reduced materials, under the umbrella brand Nexigen.

Klöckner & Co's customers are small and medium-sized companies as well as large international corporations, many of which are mainly in the construction industry and the mechanical and plant engineering sectors. The group also supplies intermediate products for the automotive, shipbuilding, and consumer goods industries. Klöckner & Co is digitizing its supply and service chains across the board. To this end, a dedicated center for digitalization, kloeckner.i, was established at the end of 2014. One of its digital applications is the Kloeckner Assistant, which uses artificial intelligence to automatically process incoming price inquiries and orders received by fax or phone.

Klöckner & Co also invests in venture capital funds and directly in start-ups via its own investment company.

=== Steel/metal products ===
Klöckner & Co offers a total of more than 150,000 products. The range is divided into the areas of long steel products (steel beams for the construction industry), flat steel products (sheet steel for mechanical engineering), hollow sections (hollow sections for steel construction), stainless and quality steel (high-alloy round steel for mechanical engineering), tubes and hollow sections (precision tubes), aluminum (aluminum profile bars for plant construction) and CO_{2}-reduced steel, stainless steel, and aluminum products. The company's focus is on flat and long products.

=== Additional services ===
In addition to unprocessed materials and primary products, the group offers various services such as steel service coil processing (cutting and splitting of strip steel), forming and production of pressed parts, CNC turning and milling, 2D/3D laser tube processing, laser and water jet cutting, processing of quality and engineering steel, thermal cutting (plasma and oxyfuel flame cutting), surface treatment (blasting and priming) and sawing/drilling/bending.

=== Sustainability ===
For 2023, Klöckner & Co received the German Sustainability Award (Deutscher Nachhaltigkeitspreis, DNP) in the Climate Transformation Field category. The award honors companies, organizations, and projects that make pioneering contributions to combating the climate crisis.

The Science Based Targets initiative (SBTi) recognized the group's CO_{2} targets as scientifically sound in the regular process.
