= Worthington Steel =

American steel processing company

Worthington Steel, Inc. (2023-Present)
- Formerly: The Worthington Steel Company (1955–1971), Worthington Industries (1971–2023)
- Type: Public
- Traded as: NYSE: WS
- Industry: Steel processing
- Founded: June 3, 1955; 71 years ago
- Founder: John H. McConnell
- Headquarters: Columbus, Ohio
- Key people: Geoff Gilmore, President and CEO, Jeff Klinger, COO and Tim Adams, CFO
- Products: steel processing, electrical steel laminations, tailor welded solutions
- Number of employees: Approximately 5,000
- Website: www.worthingtonsteel.com

Worthington Steel is an American publicly traded (NYSE:WS) steel processing company headquartered in Columbus, Ohio. Worthington Steel is an independent, intermediate processor of carbon flat-rolled steel in the United States, purchasing steel from integrated steel mills and mini-mills and custom processing it in areas such as type, length, width, thickness, shape and surface quality. Worthington Steel provides steel processing capabilities such as pickling, galvanizing and slitting, electrical steel laminations and tailor welded blanks for end-use markets including automotive, agriculture, construction, energy and heavy truck.

== History ==
On June 3, 1955, Worthington Steel was founded by John H. McConnell.

The Worthington Steel Company started with a single slitter line and a few employees, grossing $342,000 in its first year. During the late 1950s and into the 1960s, the company added steel processing capabilities to its operations and reached sales of $12.5 million in 1967.

The Worthington Steel Company became a publicly traded company in 1968 through the National Association of Securities Dealers Automated Quotations (now known as Nasdaq). Shareholders purchased 150,000 shares at $7.50 each.

Throughout the 1960s and 1970s, The Worthington Steel Company acquired new companies. In 1971, with the acquisition of a pressure cylinder business, The Worthington Steel Company name changed to Worthington Industries.

Operating under the name Worthington Industries, the company expanded its operations throughout the 1980s.

In 1992, Worthington Industries launched a joint venture called the TWB Company, expanding into the tailor welded blank market in North America.

In 2000, Worthington Industries moved from Nasdaq to the New York Stock Exchange (NYSE: WOR). Throughout the 2010s, Worthington acquired new businesses and facilities, including Rome Strip Steel Company, Inc., and Heidtman Steel Product Inc.'s pickling and slitting operation in Cleveland, Ohio.

In 2021, Worthington Industries acquired Chicago-based electrical steel company, Tempel Steel.

On Dec. 1, 2023, Worthington Industries separated into Worthington Steel (NYSE: WS) and Worthington Enterprises (NYSE: WOR). Worthington Steel's CEO is now Geoff Gilmore.

In March 2024, Worthington Steel's joint venture TWB Company, LLC licensed ArcelorMittal Tailored Blanks' patented ablation technology to enter the hot formed tailored blanking market.

In December 2024, Worthington Steel announced plans to acquire a 52% stake in Sitem SpA, a Trevi, Italy-based maker of electric motor laminations. The deal, terms of which were not disclosed, is expected to close in early 2025.

=== Name change ===
1955-1971: The Worthington Steel Company operated under this name from its founding until 1971.

1971-2023: Worthington Industries. In 1971, The Worthington Steel Company purchased Lennox Industries, a Columbus-based pressure cylinder business. With this acquisition, a new name was formed for the company, Worthington Industries.

December 2023-present: Worthington Steel, Inc. In late 2023, Worthington Industries separated into two stand-alone, public companies, Worthington Steel (NYSE: WS) and Worthington Enterprises (NYSE: WOR), bringing its steel processing business back to its original name, Worthington Steel.

== Philosophy ==
Worthington Steel's philosophy is documented in the book, Our Golden Rule, by Founder John H. McConnell. The book also documents The Worthington Steel Company putting all of its employees on a salary plan and introducing a profit-sharing incentive plan in 1966.

That same year, Employee Councils were introduced as a two-way communication system between employees and leadership. Worthington Steel still uses Employee Councils today.

== The Worthington Companies Foundation ==
Previously operating under the name of the Worthington Industries Foundation, The Worthington Companies Foundation is a philanthropic partnership between Worthington Steel and Worthington Enterprises. The Foundation supported 73 organizations in 2024 in focus areas of Health, Human Services, Youth Education, and Civic Causes.
