= Whiggism =

British political philosophy

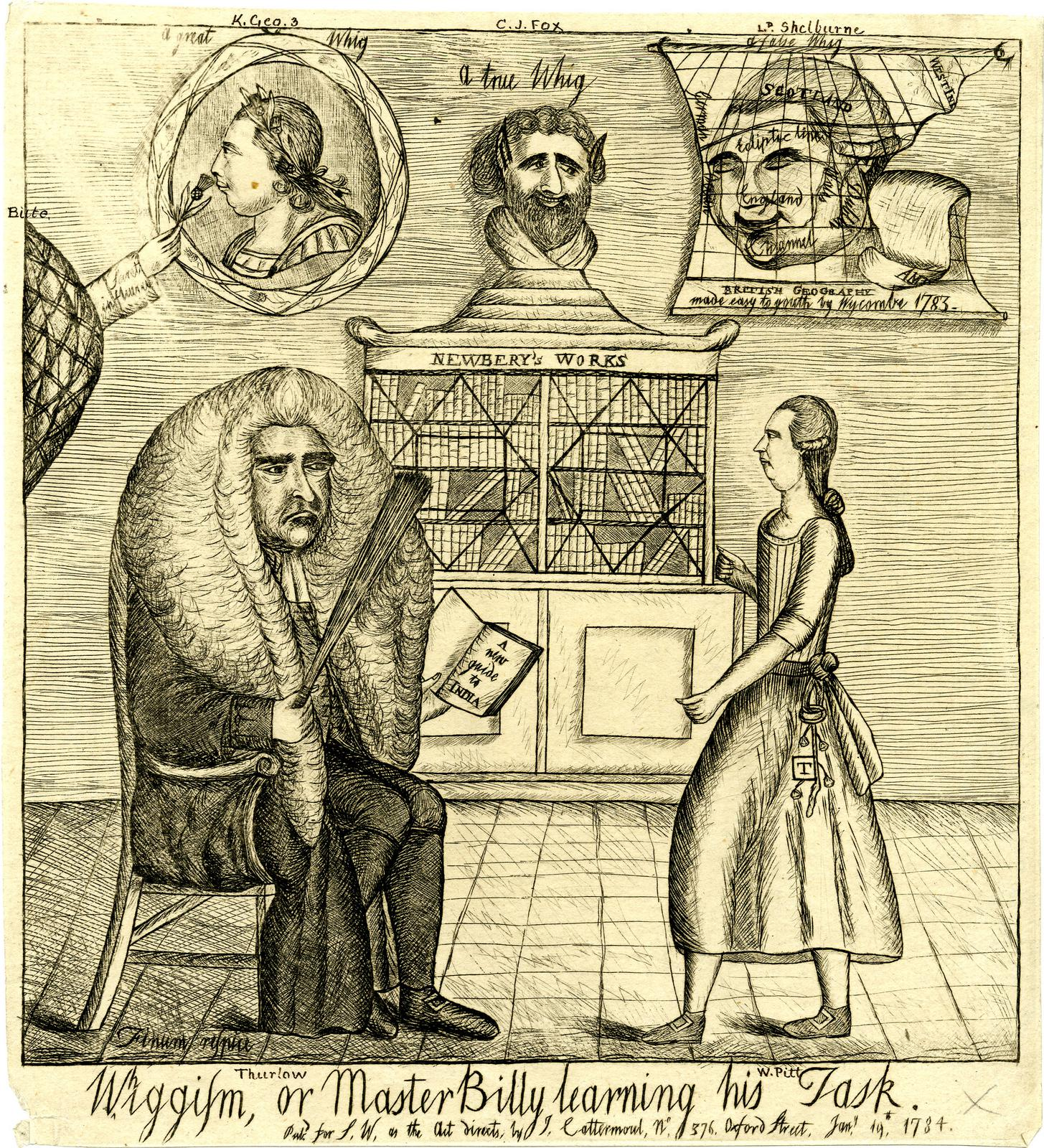
Whiggism, or Master Billy learning his task, cartoon of 1784. Lord Thurlow acts as schoolmaster to William Pitt the Younger. The schoolroom contains images of King George III, labelled a "Great Whig", and implied to be under the influence of Lord Bute; Charles James Fox, labelled a "True Whig"; and Lord Shelburne, labelled a "False Whig".

Whiggism, or Whiggery, is a political philosophy that grew out of the Parliamentarian faction in the Wars of the Three Kingdoms (1639–1653) and was concretely formulated by Lord Shaftesbury during the Stuart Restoration. The Whigs advocated the supremacy of Parliament (as opposed to that of the king), government centralisation, and coercive Anglicisation through the educational system. They also staunchly opposed granting freedom of religion, civil rights, or voting rights to anyone who worshipped outside of the Established Churches of the realm. Eventually, the Whigs grudgingly conceded strictly limited religious toleration for Protestant dissenters, while continuing the religious persecution and disenfranchisement of Roman Catholics and Scottish Episcopalians. They were particularly determined to prevent the ascension of a Catholic heir presumptive to the British throne, especially of James II or his legitimate male descendants and instead granted the throne to the Protestant House of Hanover in 1714. Whig ideology is associated with classical liberalism and early conservative liberalism.

Beginning with the Titus Oates plot and Exclusion Crisis of 1679–1681, and the Glorious Revolution of 1688–1689, Whiggism dominated English and British politics until about 1760, after which the Whigs splintered into different political factions. In the same year, King George III was crowned and allowed the Tories back into Government. Even so, some modern historians now call the period between 1714 and 1783 the "age of the Whig oligarchy".

Even after 1760, the Whigs still included about half of the newest noble families in England, Ireland, Wales, and Scotland, as well as most merchants, dissenters, and the middle classes. The opposing Tory position was held by the other great families, the non-juring and high church factions within the Church of England, many Catholics and Protestant Dissenters, most of the landed gentry and the traditional officer class of the British armed forces. Whigs especially opposed regime change efforts by adherents of Jacobitism, a movement of legitimist monarchists which promised freedom of religion and civil rights to all outside the Established Churches, devolution in the United Kingdom, linguistic rights for minority languages, and many other political reforms, and which shared a substantial overlap with and heavily influenced both early Toryism and what is now termed traditionalist conservatism. While in power, Whig politicians frequently denounced all their political opponents and critics as "Jacobites" or "dupes of Jacobites".

The terms "Old Whigs" and "Patriot Whigs" were also used in Great Britain for those Whigs who formed a de facto coalition with the Tories and jointly opposed Robert Walpole as part of the Country Party.

Whiggism originally referred to the Whigs of the British Isles, but the name of "Old Whigs" was largely adopted by the American Patriots in the Thirteen Colonies of British North America. Before and during the American Revolution, American Whiggism, in a deeply ironic reversal, weaponised Whig political philosophy about the social contract enforced by the right of revolution against both the Whig-dominated government in Westminster and the Hanoverian monarchs. In the process, American Whiggism ultimately transitioned from monarchism into republicanism and Federalism, while also co-opting many traditionally Jacobite, Counter-Enlightenment, and early Tory positions. A similar but far more discreet co-opting was also taking place in the British Isles among many self-described Whigs, including Edmund Burke, Henry Grattan, William Wilberforce, Daniel O'Connell, and William Pitt the Younger. Even though they were often influenced in this regard by the writings of early Tories and other intellectual critics of the Whig party like Jonathan Swift, Lord Bolingbroke, and David Hume, these reformist Whigs, similarly to American Patriots, refused to use the word "Tory" as anything other than a term of abuse against those with more traditionalist Whig ideology, which ultimately changed the word's meaning completely. Whig history, which was largely developed by Thomas Babington Macaulay to justify the party's political ideology and past practices, remained the official history of the British Empire until serious challenges were raised to its claims by John Lingard, William Cobbett, Hilaire Belloc, G. K. Chesterton, Roger Scruton, Saunders Lewis, and John Lorne Campbell.

== Origins of the term ==
Quickly following the adoption of "Whig" as the name of a political faction, the word "Whiggism" arose from the appendage of the suffix "-ism", creating a term for the Whigs' political ideology. It was already in use by the 1680s. In 1682, Edmund Hickeringill published his History of Whiggism. In 1702, writing satirically in the guise of a Tory, Daniel Defoe asserted: "We can never enjoy a settled uninterrupted Union and Tranquility in this Nation, till the Spirit of Whiggisme, Faction, and Schism is melted down like the Old-Money". The name probably originates from a shortening of Whiggamore referring to the Whiggamore Raid.

The word "Whiggery", deriving from "Whig" and the suffix "-ery", has a similar meaning and has been used since the late 17th century.

== Origins ==
The true origins of what became known as Whiggism lie in the Wars of the Three Kingdoms and the power struggle between the Parliament of England and King Charles I, which eventually turned into the English Civil Wars, but only after the example of the successful use of violent opposition to the king set by the Bishops' Wars, which were fought between the same king in his capacity as king of Scotland on the one side and the Parliament of Scotland and the Church of Scotland on the other. However, the immediate origins of the Whigs and Whiggism were in the Exclusion Bill crisis of 1678 to 1681, in which a country party battled a court party in an unsuccessful attempt to exclude James, Duke of York, from succeeding his brother Charles II as king of England, Scotland and Ireland. This crisis was prompted by Charles's lack of a legitimate heir, by the discovery in 1673 that James was a Roman Catholic, and by the so-called Popish Plot of 1678.

While a major principle of Whiggism was opposition to popery, that was always much more than a mere religious preference in favour of Protestantism, although most Whigs did have such a preference. Sir Henry Capel outlined the principal motivation of the cry of "no popery" when he said in the House of Commons on 27 April 1679:

From Popery came the notion of a standing army and arbitrary Power... Formerly the Crown of Spain, and now France, supports this root of Popery amongst us; but lay Popery flat, and there's an end of arbitrary Government and power. It is a mere chimera, or notion, without Popery.

Although they were unsuccessful in preventing the accession of the Duke of York to the throne, the Whigs in alliance with William of Orange brought him down in the Glorious Revolution of 1688. By that event, a new supremacy of parliament was established, which itself was one of the principles of Whiggism, much as it had been the chief principle of the Roundheads in an earlier generation.

The great Whiggish achievement was the Bill of Rights of 1689. It made Parliament, not the Crown, supreme. It established free elections to the Commons (although they were mostly controlled by the local landlord), free speech in parliamentary debates, and asserted the prohibition of "cruel or unusual punishment".

== Variations ==
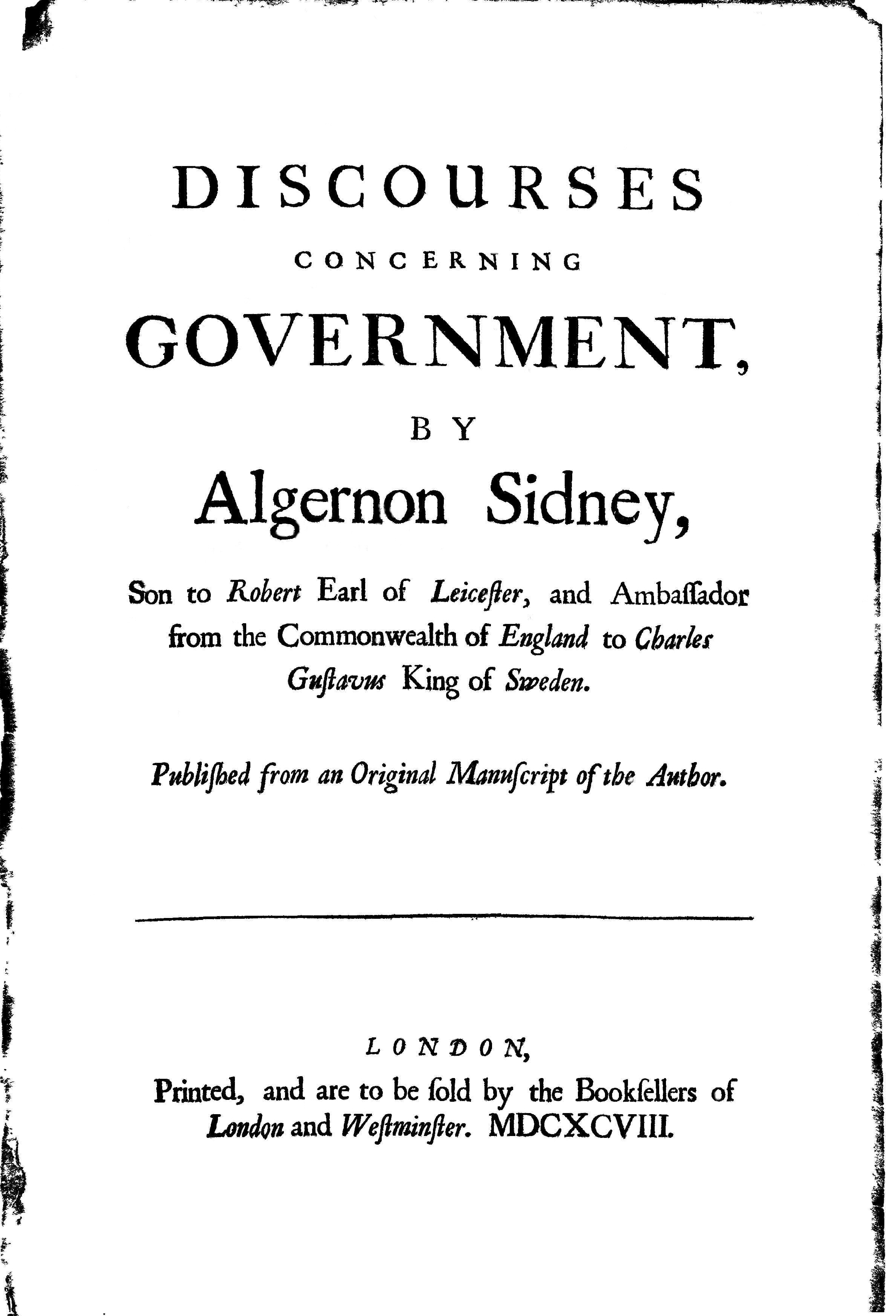
Title page of Sidney's Discourses Concerning Government (1698)

Lee Ward (2008) argues that the philosophical origins of Whiggism came in James Tyrrell's Patriarcha Non Monarcha (1681), John Locke's Two Treatises of Government (1689) and Algernon Sidney's Discourses Concerning Government (1698). All three were united in opposing Sir Robert Filmer's defence of divine right and absolute monarchy. Tyrrell propounded a moderate Whiggism which interpreted England's balanced and mixed constitution "as the product of a contextualised social compact blending elements of custom, history, and prescription with inherent natural law obligations". Sidney, on the other hand, emphasised the main themes of republicanism and based Whig ideology in the sovereignty of the people by proposing a constitutional reordering that would both elevate the authority of Parliament and democratise its forms. Sidney also emphasised classical republican notions of virtue. Ward says that Locke's liberal Whiggism rested on a radically individualist theory of natural rights and limited government. Tyrrell's moderate position came to dominate Whiggism and British constitutionalism as a whole from 1688 to the 1770s. The more radical ideas of Sidney and Locke, argues Ward, became marginalised in Britain, but emerged as a dominant strand in American republicanism. The issues raised by the Americans, starting with the Stamp Act crisis of 1765, ripped Whiggism apart in a battle of parliamentary sovereignty (Tyrrell) versus popular sovereignty (Sidney and Locke).

== Across the British Empire ==
Whiggism took different forms in England and Scotland, even though from 1707 the two nations shared a single parliament. While English Whiggism had at its heart the power of parliament, creating for that purpose a constitutional monarchy and a permanently Protestant succession to the throne, Scottish Whigs gave a higher priority to using power for religious purposes, including maintaining the authority of the Church of Scotland, justifying the Protestant Reformation and emulating the Covenanters.

There were also Whigs in the North American colonies and while Whiggism there had much in common with that in Great Britain, it too had its own priorities. In the unfolding of the American Revolution such Whiggism became known as republicanism.

In India, Prashad (1966) argues that the profound influence of the ideas of Edmund Burke introduced Whiggism into the mainstream of Indian political thought. The Indians adopted the basic assumptions of Whiggism, especially the natural leadership of an elite, the political incapacity of the masses, the great partnership of the civil society and the best methods of achieving social progress, analysing the nature of society and the nation and depicting the character of the ideal state.

== See also ==
- Whig history – Approach to historiography
- Patriot Whigs – British political faction
- Radical Whigs
- Rockingham Whigs
- True Whig Party – Political party in Liberia
- Whig Party (United States) – American political party (1833–1854)
- Patriot (American Revolution) – American revolutionaries
