= Heinrich Hiesinger =

German engineer and manager (born 1960)

Heinrich Hiesinger (born 25 May 1960) is a German engineer and manager who was the CEO of ThyssenKrupp from 2011 until 2018.

== Early life and education ==
The eldest of six children raised on a farm, Hiesinger was born in Bopfingen in southern Germany and grew up on a farm. He obtained a PhD in Electrical engineering at the Technical University of Munich, Germany.

== Career ==
=== Siemens ===
From 1992 to 2010, Hiesinger held several positions within the Siemens Group. From 1999 until 2000, he led Siemens Metering AG, based in Switzerland. When a corruption scandal led to a major management reshuffle in 2007, he became a member of the board of Siemens, under the leadership of CEO Peter Löscher. In 2008 he was additionally appointed CEO of the Industry Sector of Siemens and head of the central department Corporate Information Technology. In that capacity, during that time, he cut 2,000 jobs at the company's Industry Sector.

=== ThyssenKrupp ===
On 1 October 2010, Hiesinger left Siemens to join the board of ThyssenKrupp. On 21 January 2011, Hiesinger succeeded Ekkehard Schulz as CEO; he was the first ThyssenKrupp CEO to be hired from outside the steel industry when Chairman Gerhard Cromme brought him over from Siemens. In that capacity, he was responsible for the Asia/Pacific and China regions.

Upon becoming CEO, Hiesinger tried to shift the focus of ThyssenKrupp from the volatile steel sector to higher-margin products and services such as elevators, industrial plants and high-performance car parts. Within the first three years, he replaced about 70 percent of the 40 top managers, cut annual costs by 600 million euros and sold off ThyssenKrupp units – including civil shipbuilding and various steel units – with at least 10 billion euros ($13.6 billion) of annual sales, a quarter of group turnover. Under his leadership, the company reported its first net profit in four years in 2014. That year, Hiesinger's contract was renewed ahead of time until 2020, a sign of approval from the company's two biggest shareholders, the Alfried Krupp von Bohlen und Halbach Foundation and activist investor Cevian.

In his capacity at ThyssenKrupp, Hiesinger was part of Chancellor Angela Merkel's delegation on state visits to China in 2012, 2014 and 2016. During the Hannover Messe in April 2016, he was among the 15 German CEOs who were invited to a private dinner with President Barack Obama. At the 2018 World Economic Forum in Davos, he attended a dinner of President Donald Trump with a group of European CEOs.

By 2017, ThyssenKrupp's shares lost 18 percent during Hiesinger's time in office, underperforming an 87-percent rise in the DAX, but performed more strongly than ArcelorMittal, the world's biggest steelmaker.

On 7 July 2018, the supervisory board agreed to Hiesinger's request to terminate his contract.

== Other activities ==
=== Corporate boards ===
- Evolutionizer, Member of the Advisory Council (since 2020)
- ZF Friedrichshafen, Member of the Supervisory Board (2020–2025)
- Deutsche Post, Member of the Supervisory Board (2019–2024)
- Fresenius Management, Member of the Supervisory Board (since 2019)
- BMW, Member of the Supervisory Board (since 2017)
- ThyssenKrupp Elevator AG, Chairman of the Supervisory Board (2011-2018)
- ThyssenKrupp Steel Europe AG, Chairman of the Supervisory Board (2011-2018)

=== Non-profit organizations ===
- Baden-Badener Unternehmer-Gespräche (BBUG), Member of the Board of Trustees
- European Round Table of Industrialists (ERT), Member
- European School of Management and Technology (ESMT), Member of the Board of Trustees
- Federation of German Industries (BDI), Vice President (since 2017)
- Stifterverband für die Deutsche Wissenschaft, Member of the Board
