= Buccan =

Device for grilling

Buccan or Boucan is the native South American and Caribbean name for a wooden framework or hurdle on which meat was slow-roasted or smoked over a fire. Spaniards called the same process "barbacoa", later "barbecue".

The term "buccaneer" for pirates or privateers, is said to be derived from buccan. In the Caribbean, seafarers used the wooden frames for smoking meat, preferably pork. From this derived the French word boucane and hence the name boucanier for French hunters who used such frames to smoke meat from feral cattle and pigs on Hispaniola (now Haiti and the Dominican Republic). English colonists anglicised the word boucanier to buccaneer.
