= John P. McConnell (businessman) =

American businessman

- Born: Youngstown, Ohio, U.S.
- Occupation: Businessman
- Title: Owner of the Columbus Blue Jackets
- Parent: John H. McConnell (father)

John P. McConnell is an American businessman who is the former CEO of Worthington Industries and the son of philanthropist, Worthington Industries founder and Columbus Blue Jackets founder John H. McConnell. John P. McConnell began his career at Worthington in 1975 as a general laborer in a Louisville, Kentucky steel plant. He also worked as a sales representative for two of Worthington's divisions. McConnell served as corporate personnel director and has been instrumental in administering the company's highly recognized employee-based policies. He was appointed vice president and general manager of the company's largest steel facility in Columbus, Ohio in 1985.

A member of Worthington's board of directors since 1990, McConnell became vice chairman in 1992 and was named chief executive officer in March 1993. In September 1996 he was named chairman of the board. McConnell led Worthington as CEO from 1996 to 2020.

McConnell is also the majority owner and governor of the Columbus Blue Jackets National Hockey League franchise, inheriting the team from the elder McConnell upon his death in 2008.

Sporting positions
Preceded by John H. McConnell	Columbus Blue Jackets owner 2008–present	Incumbent
