= Edmund Hickeringill =

- Born: 1631
- Died: 1708 (aged 76–77)
- Occupation: Chaplain

Edmund Hickeringill (1631–1708) was an English churchman, soldier and author. He was separately convicted of forgery, slander and trespass.

== Education and career ==
Hickeringill attended Pocklington Grammar School prior to being admitted to St John's College, Cambridge in 1647, graduated BA in 1650/1 and was junior fellow at Caius College, Cambridge in 1651–1652. During the First English Civil War he fought on the side of the Roundheads, serving in Robert Lilburne's regiment as a chaplain, as a soldier in Scotland and in the Swedish service, ultimately becoming a captain in Charles Fleetwood's regiment. He then lived for a time in Jamaica. In 1661 he was ordained by Robert Sanderson, Bishop of Lincoln, having already changed his beliefs several times and been a Baptist, Quaker and Deist.

In 1661 he also published a pamphlet, 'Jamaica Viewed' that combined a selective version of the English occupation of the island with enthusiastic descriptions to lure English settlers to 'The Paradise of the World'. For two or three generations of English Jamaicans, the pamphlet continued to support and confirm their own self-image.

From 1662 until his death in 1708 he was vicar of All Saints' in Colchester.

== Controversy ==
In 1682, Hickeringill published his History of Whiggism.

According to the Encyclopædia Britannica Eleventh Edition, Hickeringill was "a vigorous pamphleteer, and came into collision with Henry Compton, Bishop of London, to whom he had to pay heavy damages for slander in 1682. He made a public recantation in 1684, was excluded from his living in 1685–1688, and ended his career by being convicted of forgery in 1707."

Hickeringill was involved in an important English legal case, Keeble v Hickeringill (1707) 103 ER 1127. A neighbour had set up a duck decoy and Hickeringill was shooting at the ducks from his own property in order to scare them away. He was fined £20 for trespass, even though he did not set foot on his neighbours land.
