= John H. McConnell =

American businessman (1923–2008)

John Henderson McConnell (May 10, 1923 – April 25, 2008) was the founder of Worthington Industries, which manufactures processed steel products, pressure cylinders, and metal framing. He was the founder, majority owner, chairman, and governor of the Columbus Blue Jackets NHL team. In addition, McConnell was a part of the ownership group of the AFL's Columbus Destroyers, an early investor in the MLS' Columbus Crew, and minority owner of the Pittsburgh Pirates.

A native of Pughtown, West Virginia, McConnell served in the navy aboard the aircraft carrier USS Saratoga during World War II. He went on to receive a degree in Business Administration from Michigan State University in 1949. As a young steel salesman, he founded Worthington Industries in 1955, using his car as collateral to purchase his first load of steel for custom processing. He remained chairman until 1996, and retired from the board of directors in 2002. McConnell's son, John P. McConnell, succeeded McConnell as CEO of Worthington Industries in 1993, chairman of the board in 1996 and majority owner and governor of the Blue Jackets in 2008.

Among his philanthropic contributions was a donation of over $15 million to develop the McConnell Heart Health Center at Riverside Methodist Hospital. He also donated to promote the development of the Peggy R. McConnell Arts Center, a community gathering/arts center named after his late wife. After bringing the NHL expansion franchise to Columbus, he helped establish the Columbus Blue Jackets Foundation in March 2000 with the stated goal of helping improve the quality of life throughout central Ohio.

McConnell was named the Chief Executive Officer of the Year by Financial World and Industry Week magazines. He also received the Horatio Alger Award, the National Football Foundation Gold Medal Award, the Ohio Governor's Award, and the Golden Plate Award of the American Academy of Achievement. He was inducted into the Central Ohio Business Hall of Fame, the Columbus Hall of Fame, and the Junior Achievement National Business Hall of Fame.

McConnell was raised to the sublime degree of a Master Mason in East Lansing Lodge #480, Free and Accepted Masons in East Lansing, MI on October 4, 1948, where he was made a Life Member in 1988 and presented with his 50-year award in 1998.

A tribute to "Mr. Mac" was held at Nationwide Arena for the home opener of the 2008–09 Columbus Blue Jackets season. The Blue Jackets defeated the Nashville Predators 5–3.

Sporting positions
First	Columbus Blue Jackets owner 2000–2008	Succeeded by John P. McConnell
