= Pellet grill =

Outdoor cooking device

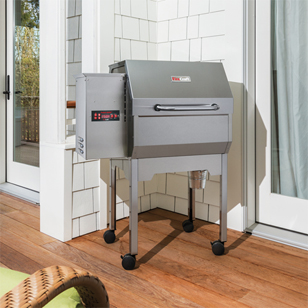
Pellet grills

Pellet grills, sometimes referred to as pellet smokers, are outdoor cookers that combine elements of charcoal smokers, gas grills, and kitchen ovens. Fueled by wood pellets, they can smoke, grill, braise, sear, and bake using an electric control panel to automatically feed fuel pellets to the fire, regulate the grill's airflow, and maintain consistent cooking temperatures.

== History ==
=== Early history and development ===
Pellet grills began in pellet stoves. During the 1973 oil crisis, an increased demand for affordable home heating spearheaded a push toward alternative heat sources, which would later include wood pellets. Wood pellets were invented in the United States in the late 1970s. They are small, eraser-sized capsules made of compressed sawdust. In the early 1980s, Jerry Whitfield (a Boeing aviation engineer from Washington) and Joe Traeger (who ran a family-owned heating company in Oregon) both began experimenting with pellet-burning stoves. Powered by electricity, these pellet stoves used a motor-driven auger to transfer a specific amount of pellets from the storage hopper to a fire pot. A fan assisted in combustion and circulated the warm air.

=== Traeger Grills ===
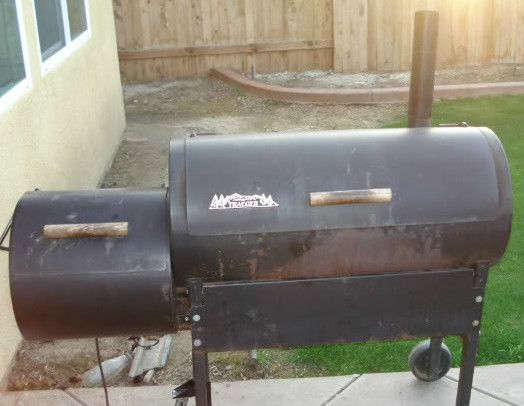
A Traeger Grill c. 1994. Note the side-mounted hopper where the pellets are stored.

The Traeger pellet grill was created by Joe Traeger in 1985, and it was granted a patent in 1987. Early Traeger Grills employed a three-position controller called an LMH controller that indicated settings for low, medium, and high heat. This controller was also used by many of the pellet grills that were first released after the Traeger patent expired. Each setting roughly corresponds to a temperature range that was attained using a fixed, predefined duty cycle.

As a result of its patent, Traeger was the only manufacturer of pellet grills for twenty years. During that time, the company remained a small family-run business that distributed its pellet grills to a limited network of stores. After Traeger's patent expired in 2007, other pellet grill companies entered the market with similar technology. Joe Traeger and his son Brian sold their rights to Traeger Grills to a Florida Venture Capitalist for $12.4 million. In 2014, the Florida firm sold Traeger Grills to the private equity firm Trilantic Capital Partners. In 2018, Joe and Brian Traeger were hired by Danson's, which owned several grill companies, including Louisiana Grills and Pit Boss Grills. In 2019, Louisiana Grills announced the hire by unveiling a new line of grills, the Founders Legacy line, and advertisements stated "brought to you proudly by Joe Traeger, the founder of the original pellet grill," and showed the "Traeger Barn" that had been used in many of Traeger's advertisements. The new owners sued the Traegers and Dansons for using the barn and promotions involving the Traegers.

== Function ==
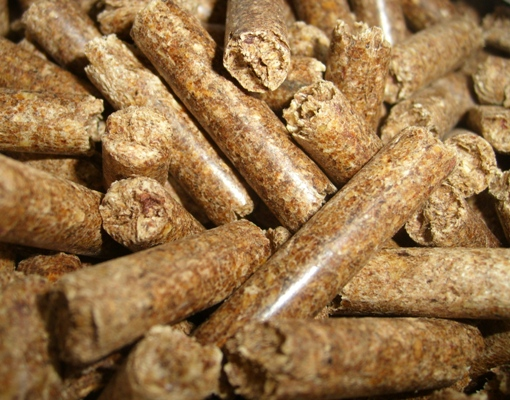
Wood pellets

Pellet stoves and pellet grills both run on wood pellets but there are differences in the pellets they burn. In addition to hardwood, pellets used for home heating often contain softwood and biomass scrap, which could be harmful if ingested. Pellet grills use food-grade pellets that are made entirely from hardwood, although some manufacturers use soybean oil or vegetable oil as a lubricant during production.

Cooking with food-grade pellets produce a light smoky flavor. Wood pellet varieties include oak, maple, apple, alder, mesquite, cherry, hickory, and pecan.

Many turn to pellet grills as an alternative to traditional smokers.

Some pellet grill manufacturers have implemented Wi-Fi-enabled controls that allow for remote monitoring of the grill. Pellet grill technology is being integrated into other cooking devices, such as traditional ceramic Kamado-style grills and pizza ovens.

=== Temperature control ===
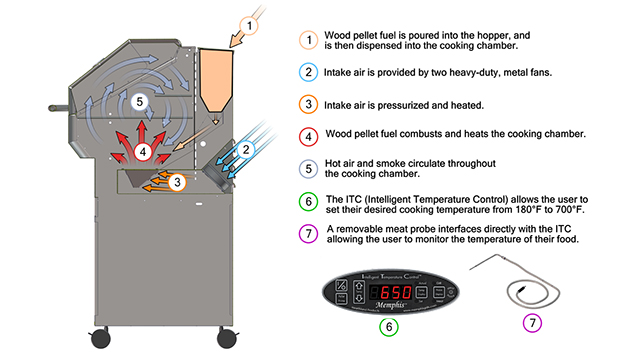
Pellet grill operation

Pellet grills use automated fuel and air delivery, and can maintain a user-selected temperature.

First, the desired temperature is programmed into the electronic control panel. A motor-driven auger then feeds a small amount of pellets from the hopper to the fire pot. Igniter rods light the pellets and prime the fire, raising the grill to an initial starting temperature of 140 °F (60 °C) to 180 °F (82 °C), depending on the manufacturer. Once the fire is ready, the desired temperature is achieved via a repeated duty cycle, which represents a segment of time when the auger is active and idle. A single duty cycle starts when the auger turns on and begins feeding pellets then continues through the period when it shuts off and remains idle. The duty cycle ends when the auger turns on again. Duty cycles are typically stated as a percentage that represents the amount of time the auger is running—an auger that's always on has a 100% duty cycle, while one that is on half the time has a 50% duty cycle. Each temperature setting has a different duty cycle. However, the auger-on portion of the duty cycle remains constant. Lower temperatures have longer auger-off periods, while high temperatures have shorter periods.

==== Multi-position and digital controllers ====
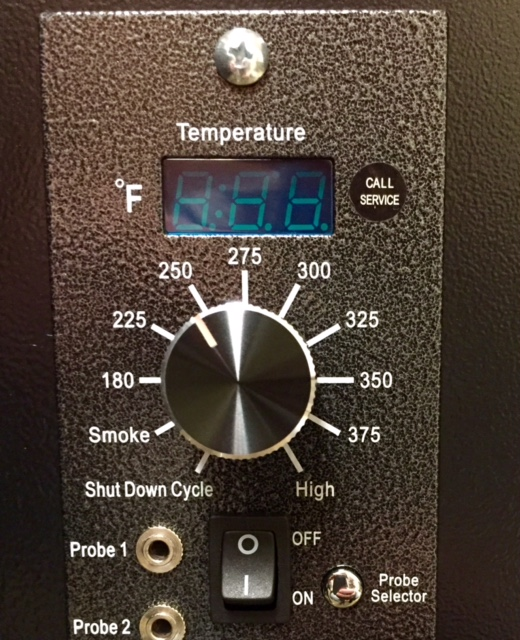
A multi-position controller

Some brands have switched to fully digital control panels that, in addition to a LED display, use a one-touch interface. The sensor uses a feedback loop, it measures the grill temperature and sends the information to the controller, which initiates or halts the auger when the grill exceeds or falls below a specified threshold.

Multi-position and digital controllers developed refined auger duty cycles. It also keeps large amounts of pellets from pilling up in the fire pot.

=== PID controllers (adjustable duty cycle) ===
When the desired temperature is set into a PID controller, the pellet grill ignites the pellets and begins an initial warm-up to a predetermined temperature. The PID controller fine-tunes the rate at which pellets are fed by learning how long and how much fuel it takes to raise the pellet grill's temperature under the current conditions. Using an advanced algorithm, the PID controller applies this data to calculate a duty cycle and adjusts the duty cycle as necessary until it reaches the programmed temperature. These adjustments continue for hours, even after the programmed temperature has been met.
