= Discourses Concerning Government =

1698 work by Algernon Sidney

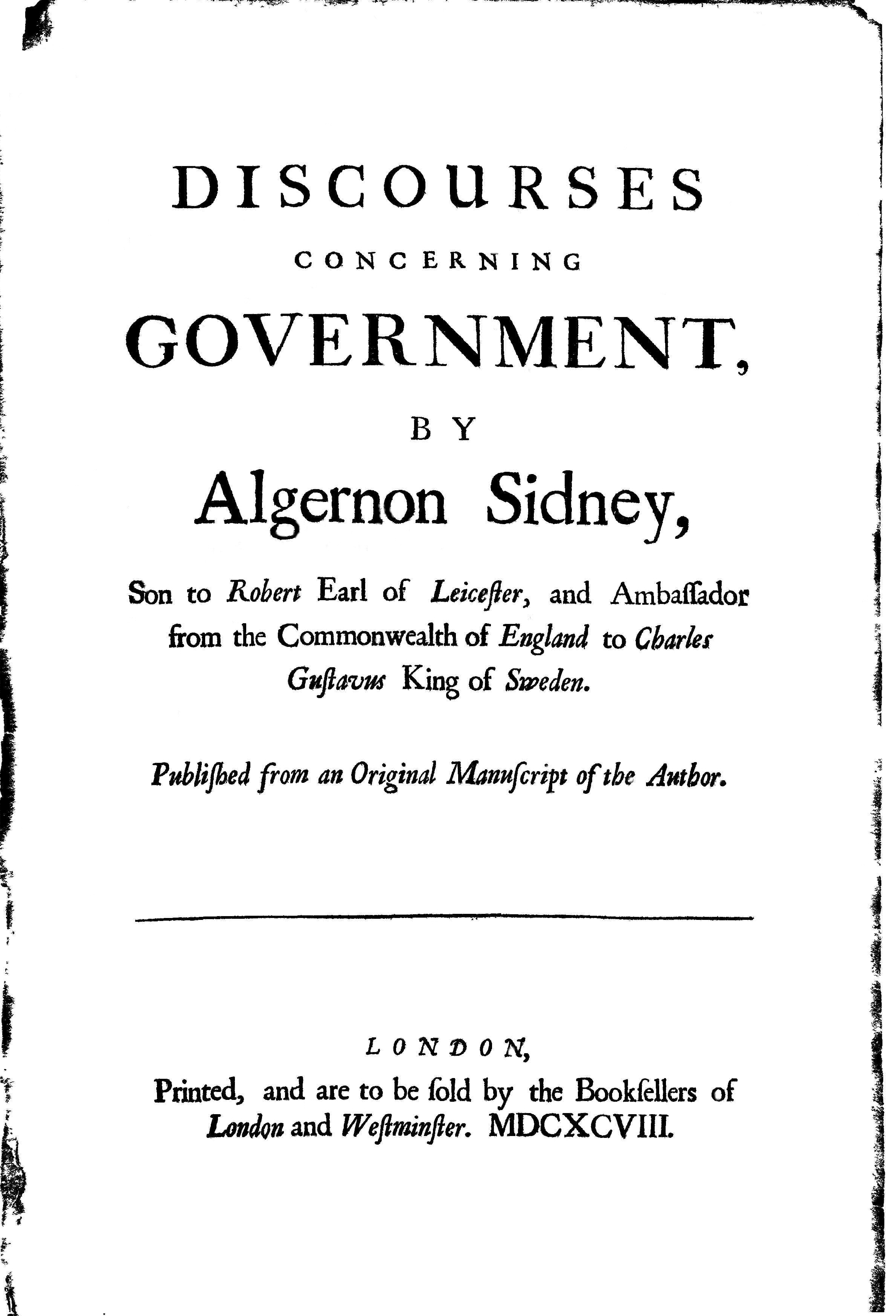
Title page of Discourses Concerning Government, 1698

Discourses Concerning Government is a political work published in 1698 and based on a manuscript written in the early 1680s by the English Whig activist Algernon Sidney, who was executed on a charge of treason in 1683. It is one of the treatises on governance produced by the Exclusion Crisis of the last years of the reign of Charles II of England. Modern scholarship regards the 1698 book as "fairly close" to Sidney's manuscript. According to Christopher Hill, it "handed on many of the political ideas of the English revolutionaries to eighteen-century Whigs, American and French republicans."

== Views ==
The Discourses was written in the period when John Locke was working on his Second Treatise on Government, and the books have common features. They have been described together as "essentially radical and popular theories of resistance." Jonathan Scott, however, has proposed that Sidney was "far more inclined to commonwealth principles and far more predisposed to resistance" than Locke. Mihoko Suzuki mentions "the lasting importance of the English Revolution and radical Protestantism" for "Sidney's political thought and his commitment to republican principles." He was included in the "Whig canon" of writers introduced by Caroline Robbins, with principles in line with those of radical dissidents from the 1689 Settlement of the English monarchy.

Leopold von Ranke's History of England (in the translation by the School of Modern History at Oxford) stated that:

The work, more discursive than systematic in its character, contains the results of many varied studies, as far as the existing learning made them in any way possible; it offers wide prospects and general points of view, but bears at the same time the character of the moment, and is founded on the disputes of the time.

Ranke's summation in the English context is "His idea is first of all to restrain the monarchy within the narrowest limits."

Scott A. Nelson, editor of the 1993 edition of the Discourses, commented:

The text displays a disorganized prose that must have been worthless as a tract of insurrection. But a careful reading displays a remarkably consistent view of government [...]

== Contra Patriarcha ==
The Discourses is explicitly a rebuttal of Patriarcha, or The Natural Power of Kings, a work published in 1680 by the political theorist Robert Filmer, who had died in 1659. It seeks support from authors criticised by Filmer, such as George Buchanan and Hugo Grotius. Ranke states that Sidney opposed Filmer "in every point".

Sidney's real target in the work was absolutism. While he concedes that absolute monarchy is an institution with Biblical support, and equates it with Plato's political philosophy, he denies that hereditary monarchy has any such standing. On the spectrum of English representatives of classical republicanism of the time, Scott places Sidney with John Milton as "moral humanists". Nicholas von Maltzahn considers that Sidney's was "a voice closer to Milton's than any other in the Restoration, one sharing his republican vocabulary and priorities to a remarkable degree."

Scott writes:

Sidney's reply to Filmer is an attack on the political system of inheritance, and its substitution with a politics of virtue [...]

Sidney took the view in the Discourses that the government of the Rump Parliament, in which he sat,"produced more examples of pure, complete, incorruptible, and invincible virtue than Rome or Greece could ever boast". He argues in the Discourses that "the variety of forms of government between mere democracy and absolute monarchy is almost infinite", that good government is always a blend (of monarchy, aristocracy and democracy), and that Filmer was narrow and short-sighted.

== Influence and Sidney's reputation ==
Worden writes in The Cambridge History of Political Thought that the influence of the Discourses was "probably wider than that of any other republican work of the seventeenth century." An extended review by Jacques Bernard appeared in three successive issues of Nouvelles de la république des lettres in 1700. Discours sur le gouvernement, a French translation in three volumes of the Discourses, was published at The Hague in 1702. Sidney was praised in works of 1719 by Gottlieb Treuer (de:Gottlieb Treuer) and of 1720 by Thémiseul Saint-Hyacinthe (fr:Thémiseul de Saint-Hyacinthe).

Sidney was one of the republican writers cited by Henry St John, 1st Viscount Bolingbroke in his works Remarks on the History of England (1730–31) and A Dissertation upon Parties (1733–34) discussing the ancient constitution of England. He was one of the republican influences on Alberto Radicati, an exile from Piedmont of the 1720s who came to London.

Pocock in The Machiavellian Moment calls Sidney in the Discourses

"... a voice from the past, recalling the Good Old Cause of the fifties and even the Tacitism of an earlier generation still, condemn[ing] absolute monarchy for corrupting the subject and equat[ing] virtue with a framework of mixed government so austerely defined as to be virtually an aristocratic government.

Trevor Colbourn writes that Sidney's political thought was a significant influence on Andrew Eliot, Jonathan Mayhew, Sam Adams and Josiah Quincy Jr. The Discourses was in the personal libraries of John Adams, Robert Carter I, Robert Carter III and Thomas Jefferson (listed in 1771). Adams in particular was "a lifelong Sidney enthusiast". But in the later 18th century, French republican radicals found that "his arguments were no longer relevant."
