= Right-wing politics =

Political ideologies favouring social orders

Right-wing politics, rightist politics, or rightism, is the range of political ideologies that view certain social stratifications and orders as inevitable, natural, normal, or desirable, typically supporting this position in favour of conservatism, natural law, economics, authority, property, religion, or tradition. Hierarchy and inequality may be seen as natural results of traditional social differences or competition in market economies.

Right-wing politics are considered the counterpart to left-wing politics, and the left–right political spectrum is the most common political spectrum. The right includes social conservatives, as well as laissez-faire economic policies. "Right" and "right-wing" have been variously used as compliments and pejoratives describing neoliberal and conservative economic and social ideas.

== Historical overview ==
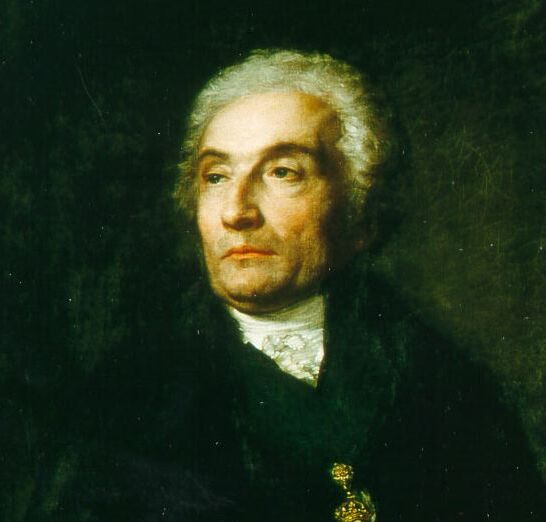
Joseph de Maistre, a historically influential right-wing and conservative ideologue

The political terms Left and Right were first used in the 18th century, during the French Revolution, referencing the seating arrangement of the new National Assembly. Those who sat to the right of the chair of the presiding officer (le président) were generally supportive of the institutions of the monarchist Old Regime. The original "Right" in France was formed in reaction to the "Left" and comprised those supporting hierarchy, tradition, and clericalism. The expression la droite ('the right') increased in use after the restoration of the monarchy in 1815, when it was applied to the ultra-royalists.

Edmund Burke is regarded as one of the most influential conservative thinkers and political writers of the 18th century, and his writings played a significant role in influencing opinions regarding conservatism following the French Revolution in 1789, and he remains a major figure in modern conservative and right-wing circles. Burke postulated the importance of religious institutions for the moral stability and good of the state. He expressed his views in a satirical book, A Vindication of Natural Society (1756). He also criticized the actions of the British government towards the American colonies, including its taxation policies. Burke supported the American colonists' right to resist metropolitan authority. He also supported Catholic emancipation.

While in the 19th century, Burke was praised by both conservatives and liberals, in the 20th century, Burke became widely regarded in the United States and the United Kingdom as the philosophical founder of conservatism. along with his ultra-royalist and ultramontane counterpart Joseph de Maistre. His publications influenced British conservative thought and helped establish the earliest foundations for modern conservatism.

The chief ideologue of French ultra-royalists, Joseph de Maistre, who was lawyer, diplomat, and political philosopher, is regarded as one of intellectual forefathers of modern conservatism. Maistre was noted for his advocacy of monarchism and social stratification in the period immediately following the French Revolution. Maistre is also regarded as one of the intellectual founders of the right-wing thought.

William F. Buckley Jr. was an American conservative writer and intellectual, who in 1955, founded National Review, a magazine for the development of the conservative movement in the United States. Buckley is widely considered to have been one of the most influential figures in the conservative movement and right-wing politics in the United States.

== Positions ==
=== Anti-communism ===
Early communists used the term "right-wing" in reference to conservatives, placing the conservatives on the right, the liberals in the centre and the communists on the left. Both the conservatives and the liberals were strongly anti-communist, but the conservatives' anti-communism was much stronger than the liberals'. The history of the use of the term right-wing in reference to anti-communism is complicated.

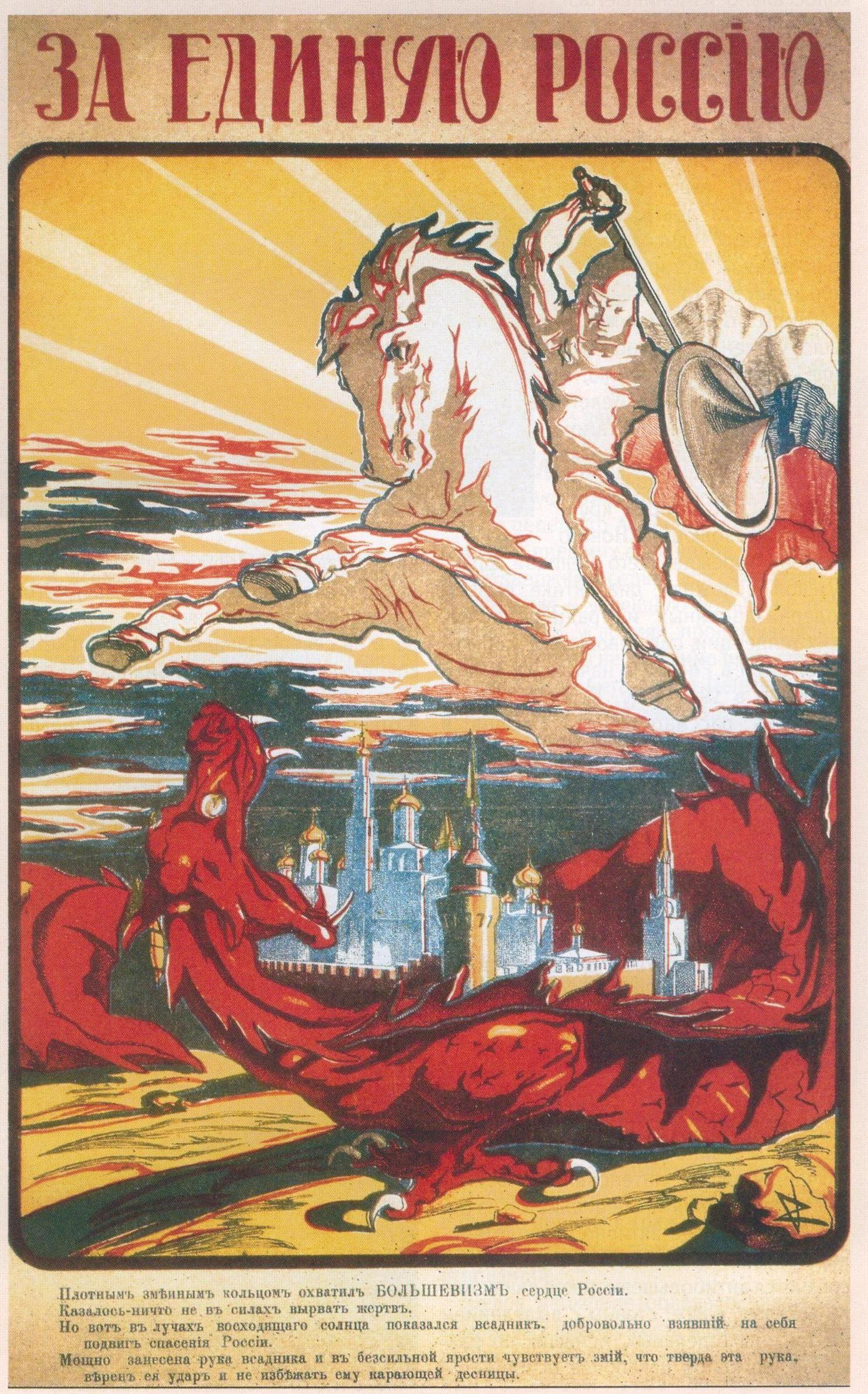
Anti-communist propaganda poster depicting the White movement which says "For a united Russia", 1919

By World War I, in most European monarchies, the divine right of kings had become discredited and was replaced by liberal and nationalist movements. Most European monarchs became figureheads, or they yielded some of their power to elected governments. The most conservative European monarchy, the Russian Empire, was replaced by the communist Soviet Union. The Russian Revolution inspired a series of other communist revolutions across Europe from 1917 to 1923. Many of these revolutions, such as the German Revolution, were crushed by nationalist and monarchist military units. During this period, nationalism was first considered right-wing, especially when it opposed the internationalism of the communists.

After World War II, communism became a global phenomenon and anti-communism became an integral part of the domestic and foreign policies of the United States and its NATO allies. Conservatism in the post-war era abandoned most of its monarchist and aristocratic roots, shifting its focus to patriotism, religious values, and nationalism. Throughout the Cold War, postcolonial governments in Asia, Africa, and Latin America turned to the United States for political and economic support. Communists were also enemies of capitalism, portraying Wall Street as the oppressor of the masses. The United States made anti-communism the top priority of its foreign policy, and many American conservatives sought to combat what they saw as communist influence at home. This situation led to the adoption of several domestic policies that are collectively referred to as McCarthyism. While both liberals and conservatives were anti-communist, the followers of Senator McCarthy were called right-wing and those on the right called liberals who favoured free speech, even free speech for communists, leftist.

=== Climate change ===
Democrats (blue) and Republicans (red) differ in views of the seriousness of addressing climate change, with the gap widening since the late 2010s mainly through Democrats' share increasing.

The sharp divide over the existence of and responsibility for global warming and climate change falls largely along political lines. Overall, 60% of Americans surveyed said oil and gas companies were "completely or mostly responsible" for climate change.

Educated and uneducated Republicans are almost equally likely to think that climate change is not human caused. Whereas opinions favoring becoming carbon neutral declined substantially with age among Republicans, but not among Democrats.

A broad range of policies to reduce greenhouse gas emissions has been proposed, but public support differs consistently along party lines.

National political divides on the seriousness of climate change consistently correlate with political ideology, with right-wing opinion being more negative.

Climate friendly policies are generally supported across the political spectrum, though there have been many exceptions among voters and politicians leaning towards the right, and even politicians on the left have rarely made addressing climate change a top priority. In the 20th century, right wing politicians led much significant action against climate change, both internationally and domestically, with Richard Nixon and Margaret Thatcher being prominent examples. Yet by the 1990s, especially in some English speaking countries and most especially in the US, the issue began to be polarized. Right wing media started arguing that climate change was being invented or at least exaggerated by the left to justify an expansion in the size of government. As of 2020, some right wing governments have enacted increased climate friendly policies. Various surveys indicated a slight trend for even U.S. right wing voters to become less skeptical of global warming, and groups like American Conservation Coalition indicate young Republican voters embrace climate as a central policy field. Though in the view of Anatol Lieven, for some right wing US voters, being skeptical of climate change has become part of their identity, so their position on the matter cannot easily be shifted by rational argument.

A 2014 study from the University of Dortmund concluded that countries with center and left-wing governments had higher emission reductions than right-wing governments in OECD countries during 1992–2008. Historically, nationalist governments have been among the worst performers in enacting policies. Though according to Lieven, as climate change is increasingly seen as a threat to the ongoing existence of nation states, nationalism is likely to become one of the most effective forces to drive determined mitigation efforts. The growing trend to securitize the climate change threat may be especially effective for increasing support among nationalist and conservatives.

A 2024 analysis found 100 U.S. representatives and 23 U.S. senators—23% of the 535 members of Congress—to be climate change deniers, all the deniers being Republicans.

=== Economics ===
In post-revolutionary France, the Right fought against the rising power of those who had grown rich through commerce, and sought to preserve the rights of the hereditary nobility. They were uncomfortable with capitalism, the Enlightenment, individualism, and industrialism, and fought to retain traditional social hierarchies and institutions. In Europe's history, there have been strong collectivist right-wing movements, such as in the social Catholic right, that have exhibited hostility to all forms of liberalism (including economic liberalism) and have historically advocated for paternalist class harmony involving an organic-hierarchical society where workers are protected while class hierarchy remains.

In the 19th century, the Right had shifted to support the newly rich in some European countries (particularly Britain) and instead of favouring the nobility over industrialists, favoured capitalists over the working class. Other right-wing movements—such as Carlism in Spain and nationalist movements in France, Germany, and Russia—remained hostile to capitalism and industrialism. Nevertheless, a few right-wing movements—notably the French Nouvelle Droite, CasaPound, and American paleoconservatism—are often in opposition to capitalist ethics and the effects they have on society. These forces see capitalism and industrialism as infringing upon or causing the decay of social traditions or hierarchies that are essential for social order.

==== Laissez-faire schools ====
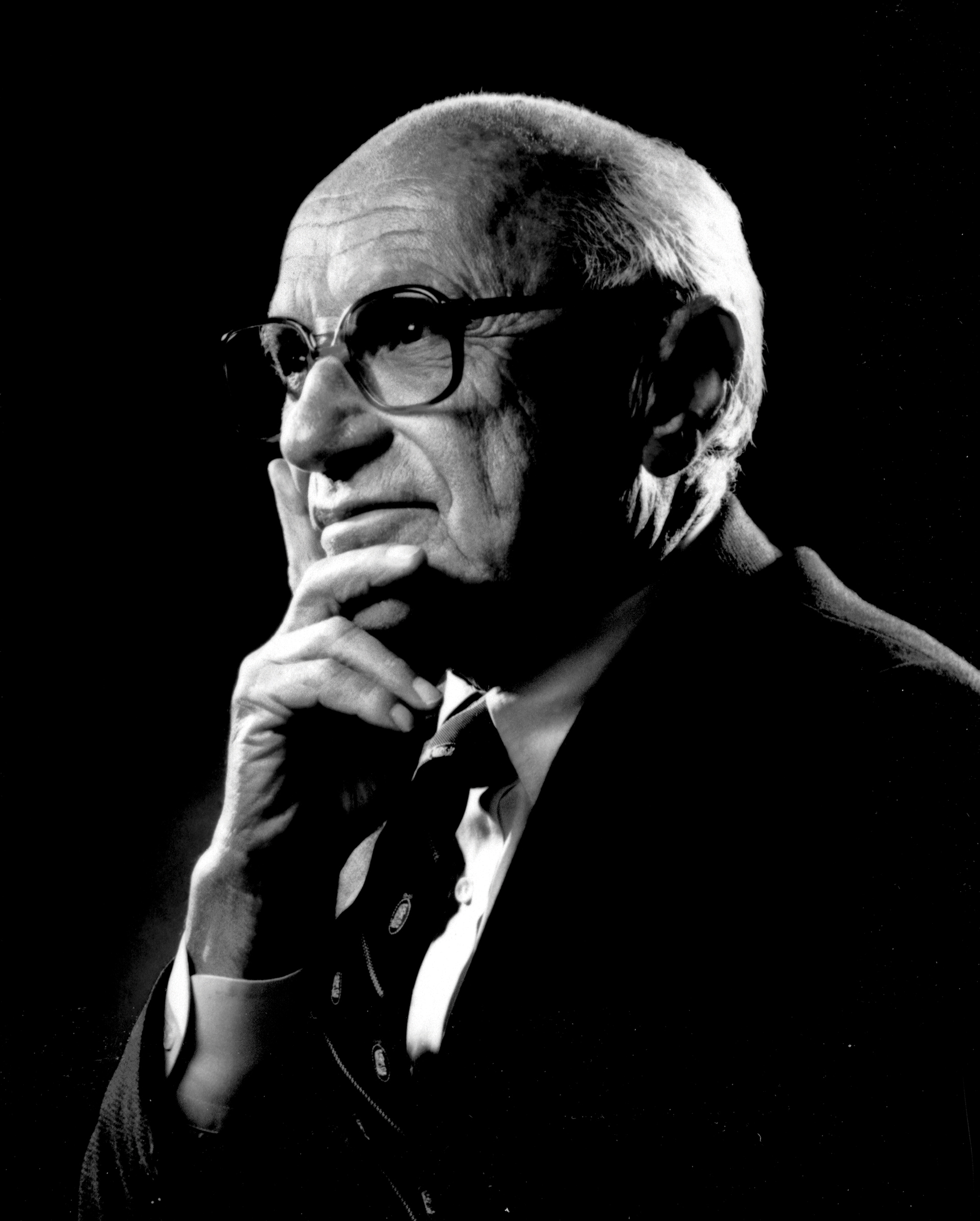
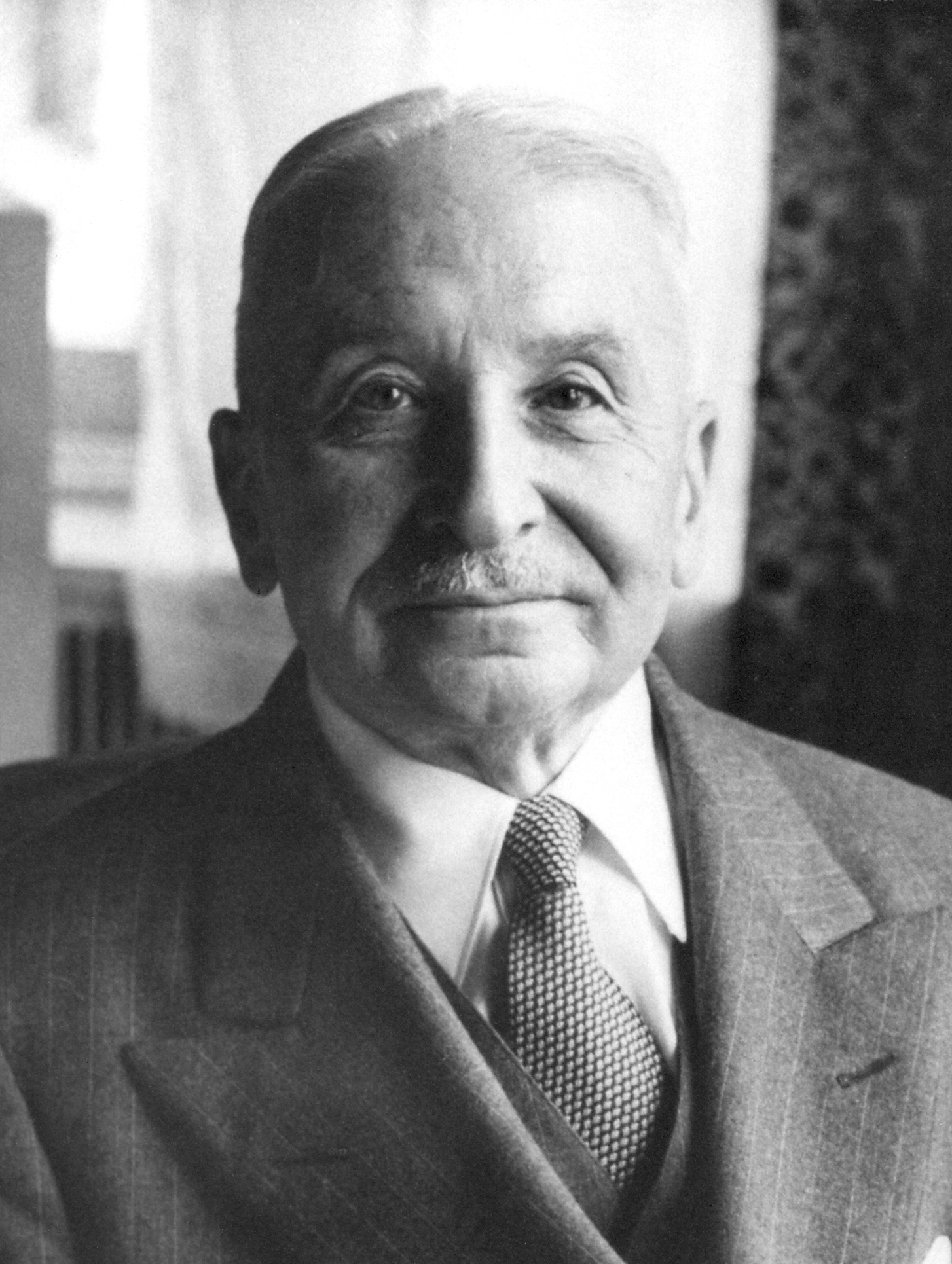
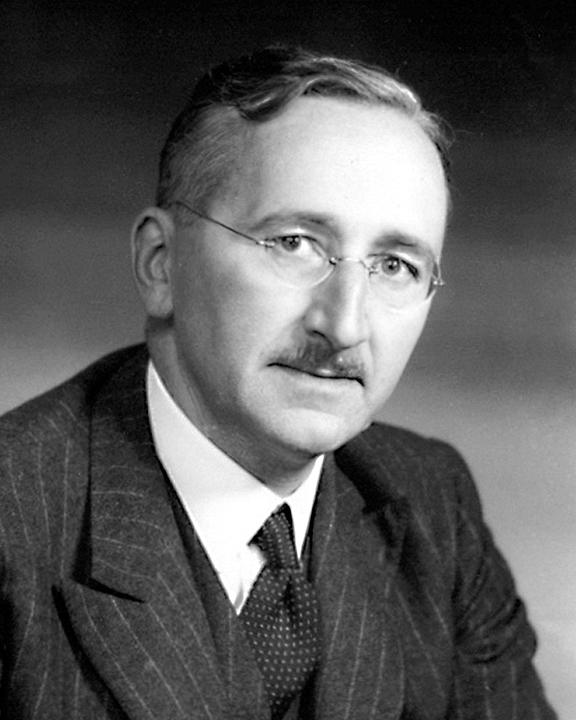
L–R: Milton Friedman, Ludwig von Mises and Friedrich Hayek, 20th century economists belonging to the Chicago and Austrian schools of economics

In modern times, "right-wing" is sometimes used to describe laissez-faire capitalism. In Europe, capitalists formed alliances with the Right during their conflicts with workers after 1848. In 1871, the Austrian school came to be with the work of Carl Menger, Eugen von Böhm-Bawerk, Friedrich von Wieser, and others, originating from methodologically opposition to the Historical school, in a dispute known as Methodenstreit. The Austrian school opposition to be heterodox, advocating strict adherence to methodological individualism, the concept that social phenomena result primarily from the motivations and actions of individuals along with their self interest. Austrian-school theorists hold that economic theory should be exclusively derived from basic principles of human action.

In France, the Right's support of capitalism can be traced to the late 19th century. The so-called neoliberal Right, popularised by US President Ronald Reagan and UK Prime Minister Margaret Thatcher, combines support for free markets, privatisation, and deregulation with traditional right-wing support for social conformity.

=== Nationalism ===
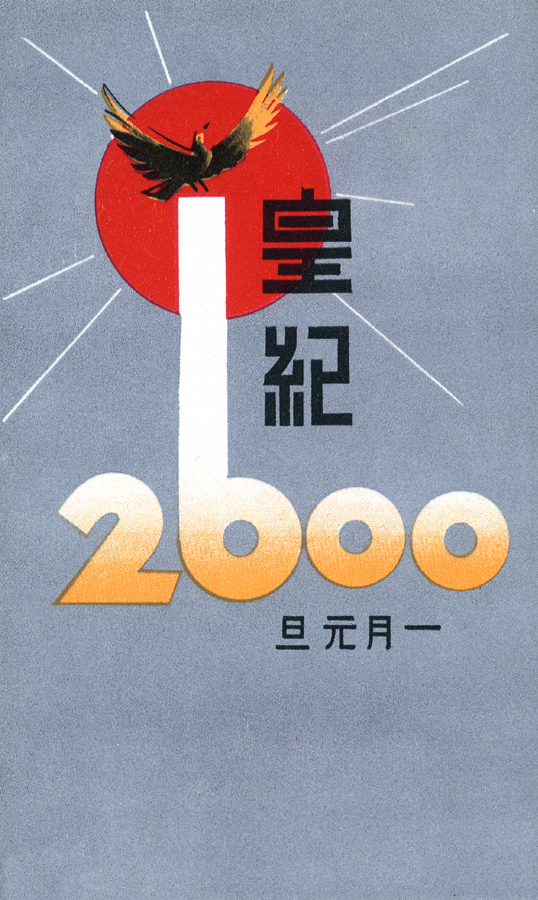
1940 postcard marking the 2600th anniversary of the mythical foundation of Japan. At the time, Japan was governed by an ultranationalist political regime.

In France, nationalism was originally a left-wing and republican ideology. After the period of boulangisme and the Dreyfus affair, nationalism became a trait of the right wing. Right-wing nationalists sought to define and defend a "true" national identity from elements which they believed were corrupting that identity. Some were supremacists, who in accordance with scientific racism and social Darwinism applied the concept of "survival of the fittest" to nations and races.

Right-wing nationalism was influenced by Romantic nationalism in which the state derives its political legitimacy from the organic unity of those who it governs. This generally includes the language, race, culture, religion, and customs of the nation, all of which were "born" within its culture. Linked with right-wing nationalism is cultural conservatism, which supports the preservation of the heritage of a nation or culture and often sees deviations from cultural norms as an existential threat.

In the 21st century, neo-nationalism came to prominence after the Cold War in the Western world. It is typically associated with cultural conservatism, populism, anti-globalisation, and nativism and is opposed to immigration. The ideology takes historical association in determining membership in a nation, rather than racial concepts.

=== Natural law and traditionalism ===
Right-wing politics typically justifies a hierarchical society based on natural law or tradition.

Traditionalism was advocated by a group of United States university professors (labelled the "New Conservatives" by the popular press) who rejected the concepts of individualism, liberalism, modernity, and social progress, seeking instead to promote what they identified as cultural and educational renewal.

=== Populism ===
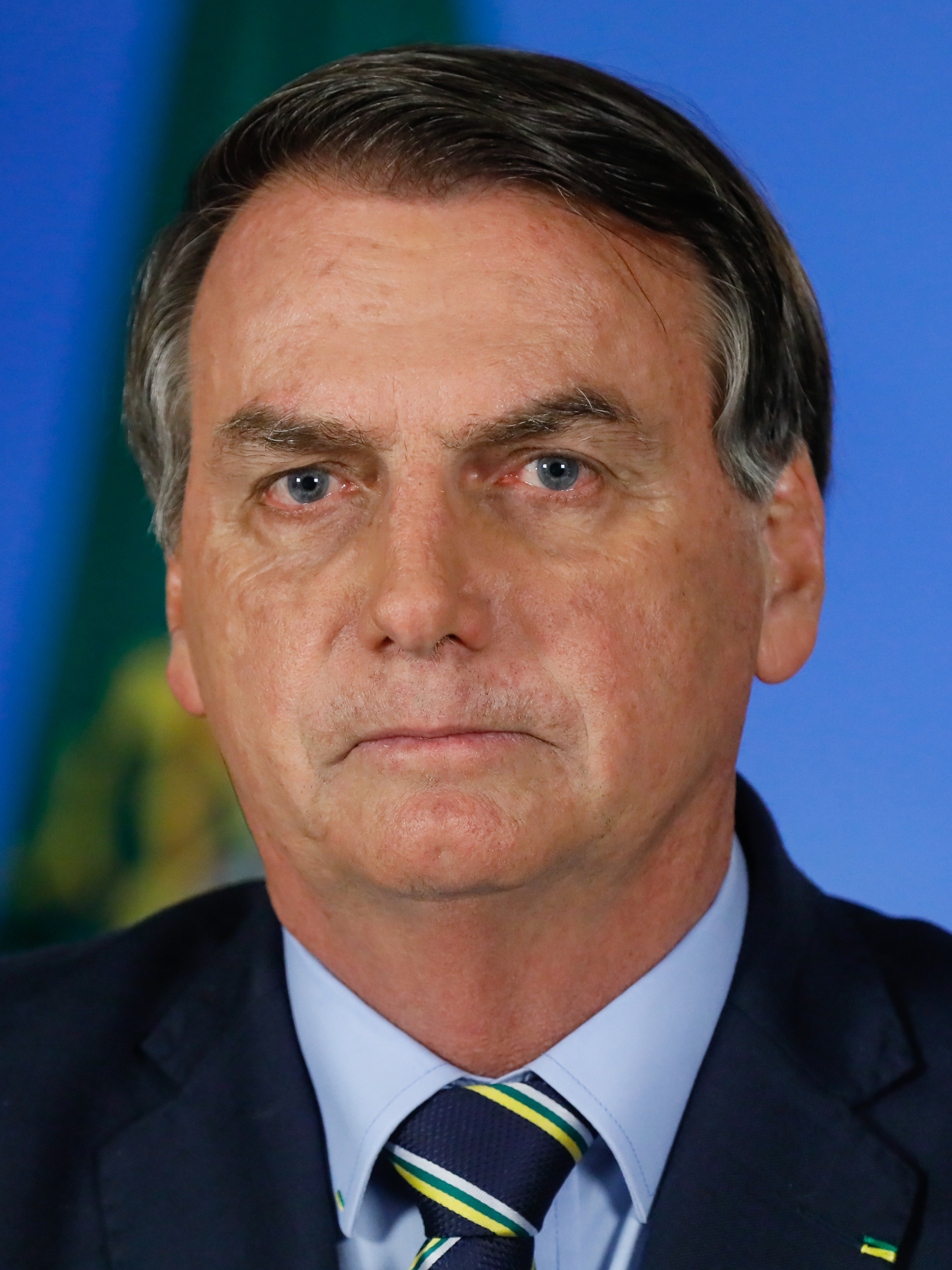
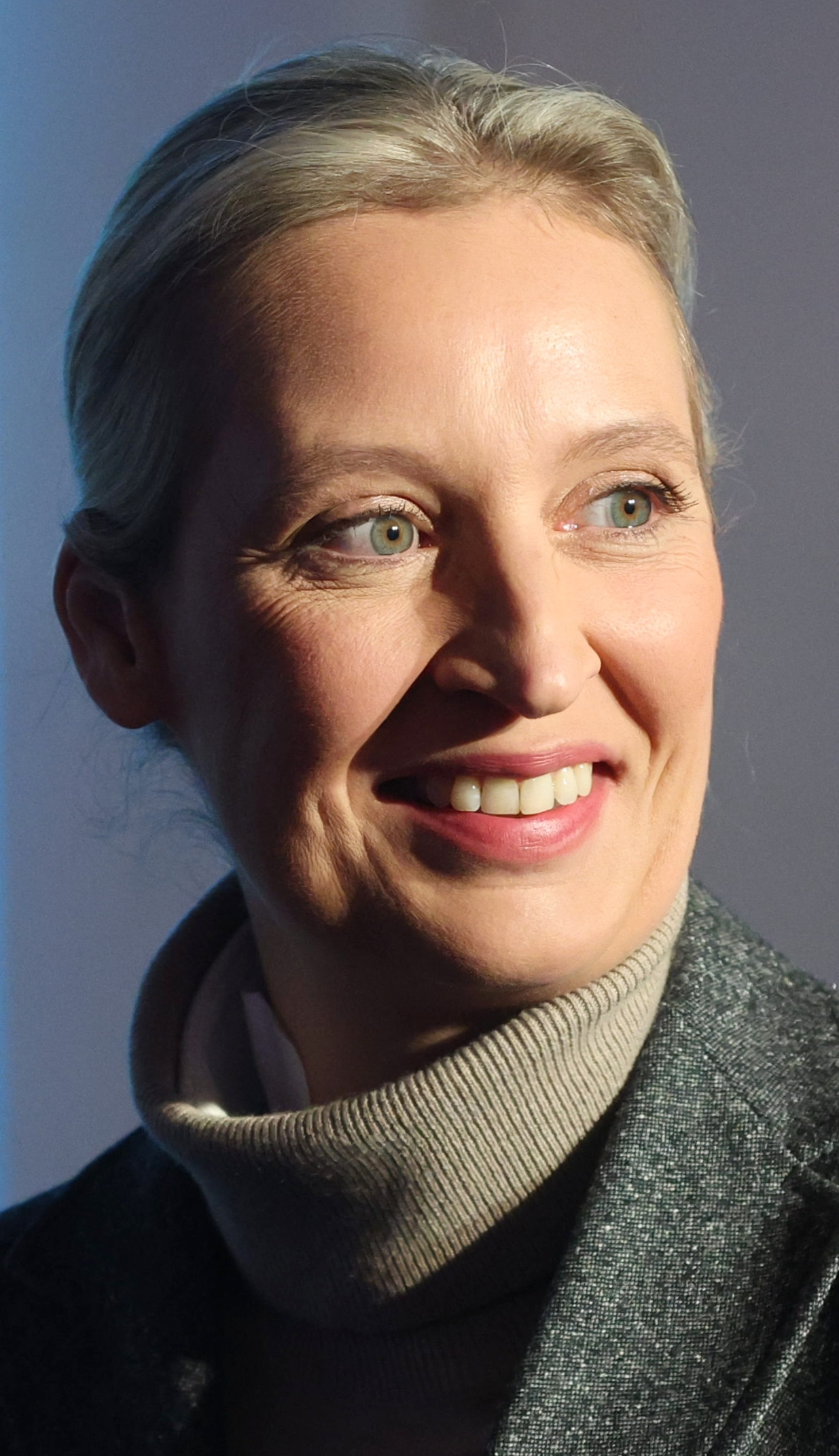
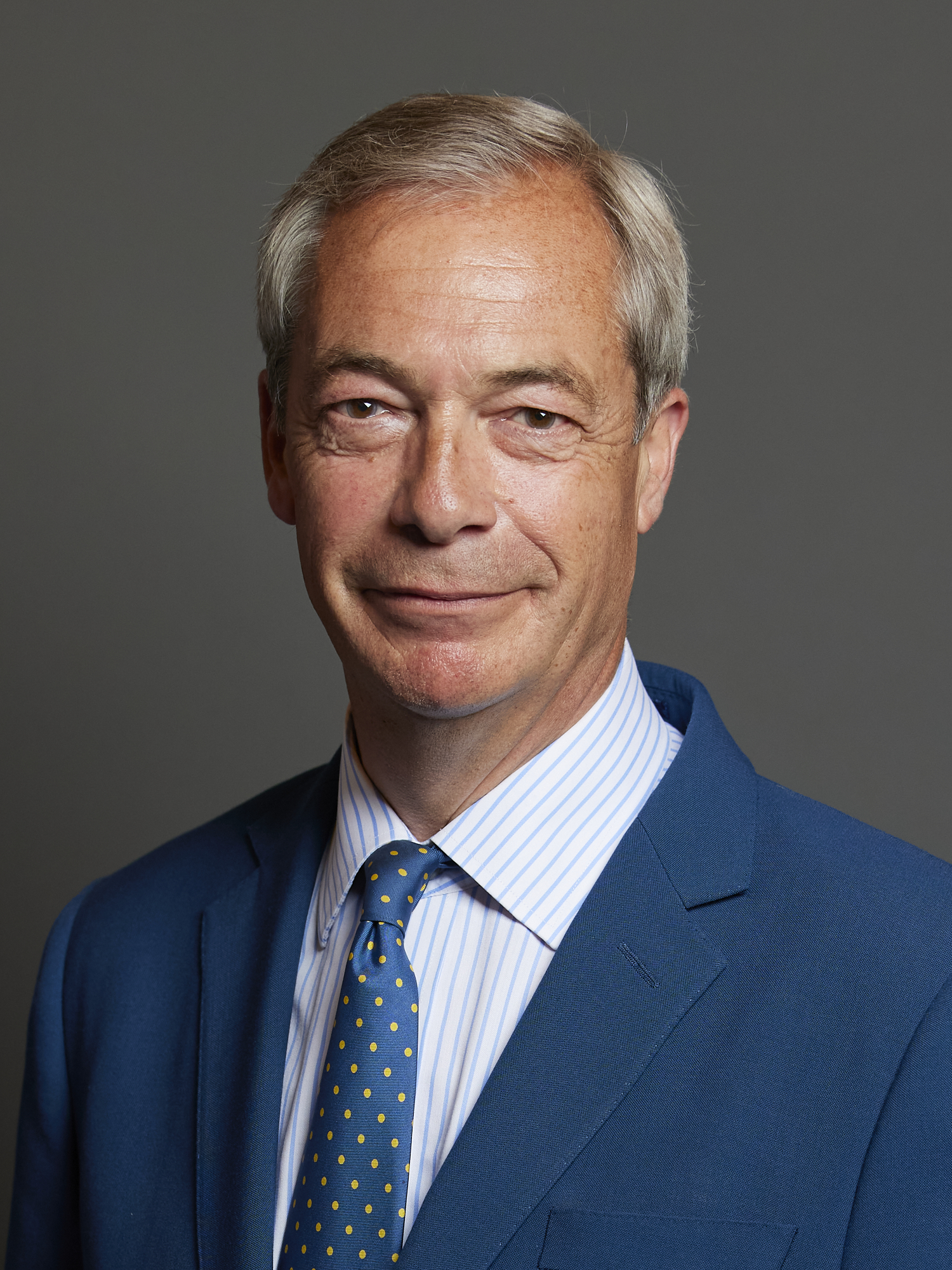
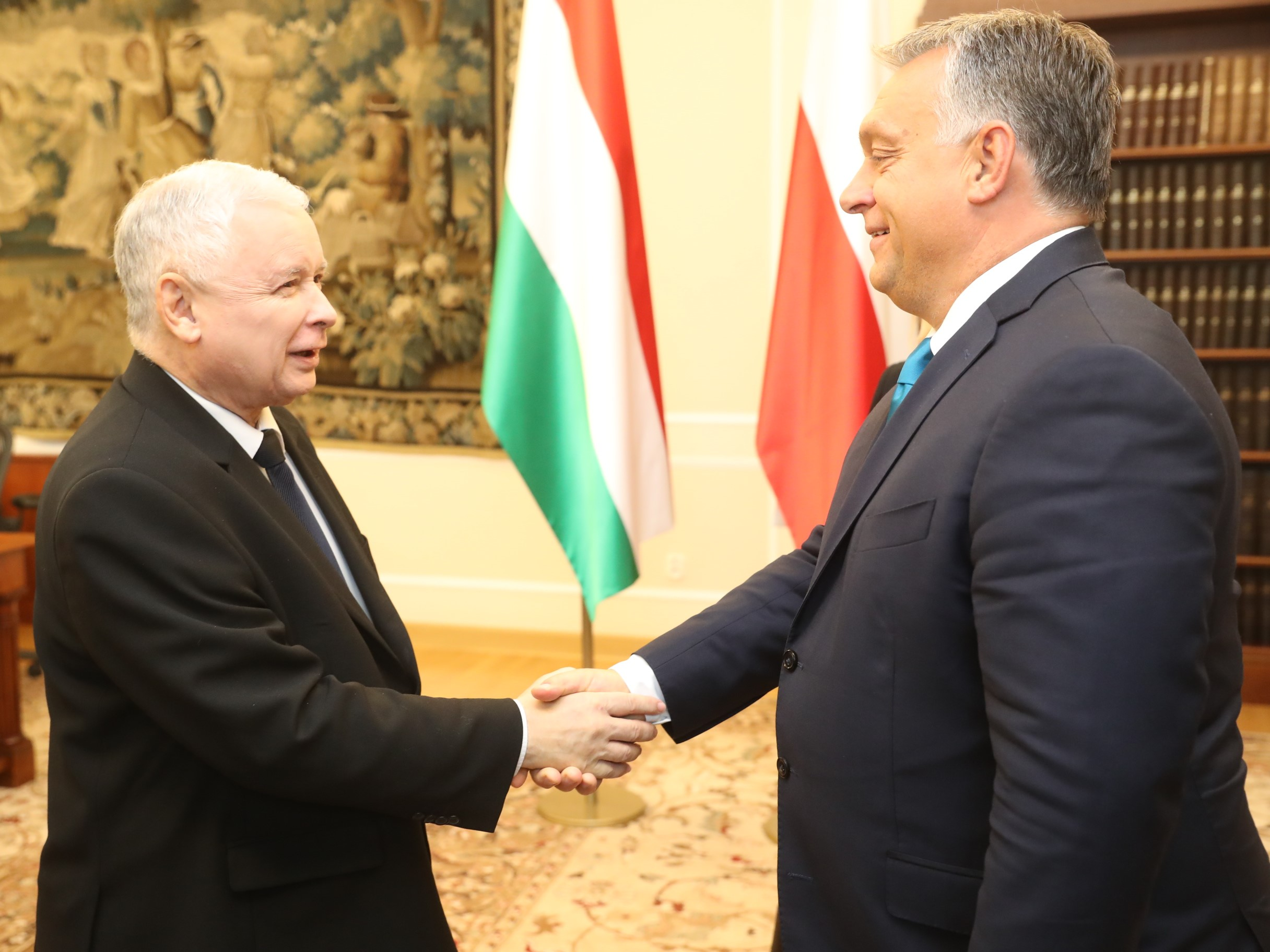
21st century right-wing populists seen from left to right, top to bottom: Jair Bolsonaro, Alice Weidel, Nigel Farage, Jarosław Kaczyński and Viktor Orbán

Right-wing populism is a combination of civic-nationalism, cultural-nationalism and sometimes ethno-nationalism, localism, along with anti-elitism, using populist rhetoric to provide a critique of existing political institutions. According to Margaret Canovan, a right-wing populist is "a charismatic leader, using the tactics of politicians' populism to go past the politicians and intellectual elite and appeal to the reactionary sentiments of the populace, often buttressing his claim to speak for the people by the use of referendums".

In Europe, right-wing populism often takes the form of distrust of the European Union (commonly known as Euroscepticism), and of politicians in general, combined with anti-immigrant rhetoric and a call for a return to traditional, national values. Daniel Stockemer states, the radical right is, "Targeting immigrants as a threat to employment, security and cultural cohesion".

In the United States, the Tea Party movement stated that the core beliefs for membership were the primacy of individual liberties as defined by the Constitution of the United States, preference for a small federal government, and respect for the rule of law. Some policy positions included opposition to illegal immigration and support for a strong national military force, the right to individual gun ownership, cutting taxes, reducing government spending, and balancing the budget.

In Indonesia, Islamic populism has a significant impact on right-wing politics. This is largely due to the historical context which Islamic organisations had during the 1960s in destroying the Indonesian Communist Party. Whilst the party is adopting democratic processes with neo-liberal market economies, socially pluralist positions are not necessarily adopted. The Islamic populism in Indonesia has boosted its influence in 1998 after the demise of the Suharto authoritarian regime. Islamic populism in Indonesia has similar properties with Islamic populist regimes like in the Middle East, Turkey and North Africa (MENA). The emphasis on social justice, pluralism, equality and progressive agendas could be potentially mobilised by Islamic cultural resources.

Flag of the Bharatiya Janata Party in India

In India, supporters of the Bharatiya Janata Party (BJP) have more authoritarian, nativist, and populist ideas than other Indian citizens. Under Narendra Modi, populism is a core part of the party's ideology. The party's rhetoric reflects the idea is that the ordinary, "good" individuals are continuously under attack from "bad" political forces, the media, etc. Since Narendra Modi became the leader of the BJP, it has increasingly been considered a populist radical right party (PRR) and has also been considered a Hindu nationalist party.

=== Religion ===
In The Possessed (1872) and The Brothers Karamazov (1880), Fyodor Dostoevsky portrayed socialism as an attempt to build a kingdom of Man as opposed to the kingdom of God. According to Dostoevsky, the intention of the latter book was to portray "the seed of the idea of destruction in our time in Russia among the young people uprooted from reality". This seed is depicted as: "the rejection not of God but of the meaning of His creation. Socialism has sprung from the denial of the meaning of historical reality and ended in a programme of destruction and anarchism".

In his 1931 encyclical Quadragesimo Anno, Pope Pius XI wrote that "true socialism" was irreconcilable with the teachings of the Catholic Church "because its concept of society itself is utterly foreign to Christian truth", stating:

"For, according to Christian teaching, man, endowed with a social nature, is placed on this earth so that by leading a life in society and under an authority ordained of God he may fully cultivate and develop all his faculties unto the praise and glory of his Creator; and that by faithfully fulfilling the duties of his craft or other calling he may obtain for himself temporal and at the same time eternal happiness. Socialism, on the other hand, wholly ignoring and indifferent to this sublime end of both man and society, affirms that human association has been instituted for the sake of material advantage alone"

— Pope Pius XI, Quadragesimo Anno, 15 May 1931

American right-wing media outlets oppose sex outside marriage and same-sex marriage, and they sometimes reject scientific positions on evolution and other matters where science is perceived to disagree with the Bible.

The term family values has been used by right-wing parties—such as the Republican Party in the United States, the Family First Party in Australia, the Conservative Party in the United Kingdom, and the Bharatiya Janata Party in India—to signify support for traditional families and opposition to the changes which the modern world has made in relation to how families live. Supporters of "family values" may oppose abortion, euthanasia, birth control and same-sex marriage.

Outside the West, the Hindu nationalist movement has attracted privileged groups which fear encroachment on their dominant positions, as well as "plebeian" and impoverished groups which seek recognition around a majoritarian rhetoric of cultural pride, order, and national strength.

In Israel, Meir Kahane advocated the belief that Israel should be a theocratic state, preferably, a Halachic state where non-Jews should have no voting rights, and the far-right organisation Lehava strictly opposes Jewish assimilation and the Christian presence in Israel. In the United States, the FBI classified the Jewish Defence League (JDL) as "a right wing terrorist group" in 2001. Many Islamist groups have been called right-wing, including the Great Union Party, the Combatant Clergy Association/Association of Militant Clergy, and the Islamic Society of Engineers of Iran.

=== Social stratification ===
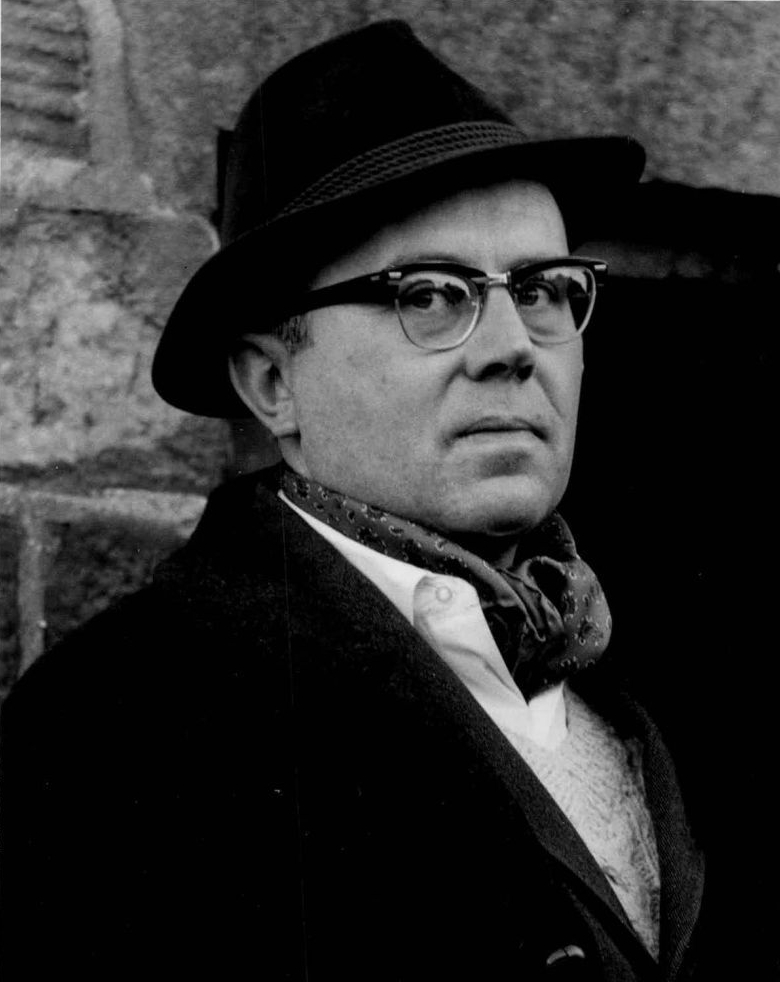
The American political philosopher Russell Kirk in 1962

Right-wing politics involves, to varying degrees, the rejection of some egalitarian objectives of left-wing politics, based on the belief that social or economic inequality is natural and inevitable or the belief that it is beneficial to society. Right-wing ideologies and movements support social order. The original French right-wing was called "the party of order" because it believed that France needed to be ruled by a strong political leader who would keep order.

The conservative British scholar R. J. White, who rejects egalitarianism, wrote: "Men are equal before God and the laws, but they are unequal in all else; hierarchy is the order of nature, and privilege is the reward of honourable service". American conservative Russell Kirk also rejected egalitarianism as imposing sameness, stating: "Men are created different; and a government that ignores this law becomes an unjust government for it sacrifices nobility to mediocrity". Italian scholar Norberto Bobbio argued that the right-wing is inegalitarian compared to the left-wing, because he argued that equality is a relative, not an absolute, concept.

Right-libertarians reject collective or state-imposed equality as undermining rewards for personal merits, initiatives, and enterprise. In their view, such imposed equality is unjust, limits personal freedom, and leads to social uniformity and mediocrity.

In the view of philosopher Jason Stanley in How Fascism Works, the "politics of hierarchy" is one of the hallmarks of fascism, which refers to a "glorious past" in which members of the rightfully dominant group sat atop the hierarchy, and attempt to recreate this state of being.

== History ==
According to The Cambridge History of Twentieth-Century Political Thought (2003), the Right has gone through five distinct historical stages:

1. The reactionary right sought a return to aristocracy and established religion.
2. The moderate right distrusted intellectuals and advocated the establishment of limited governments.
3. The radical right espoused a romantic and an aggressive form of nationalism.
4. The extreme right explicitly advocated the implementation of anti-immigration policies and it implicitly espoused racism.
5. The neo-liberal right sought to combine a market economy and economic deregulation with the traditional right-wing beliefs in patriotism, elitism and law and order.

From the 1830s to the 1880s, the Western world's social class structure and economy shifted from nobility and aristocracy towards capitalism. This shift affected centre-right movements such as the British Conservative Party, which responded supporting capitalism.

The populations of English-speaking countries did not apply the terms right and left to their politics until the 20th century. The term right-wing was originally applied to traditional conservatives, monarchists, and reactionaries; a revision of this which occurred sometime between the 1920s and 1950s considers the far-right to denote fascism, Nazism, and racial supremacy.

Rightist regimes were common in Europe during the Interwar period, 1919–1938.

=== China ===
==== Republic of China (1912–1949) ====
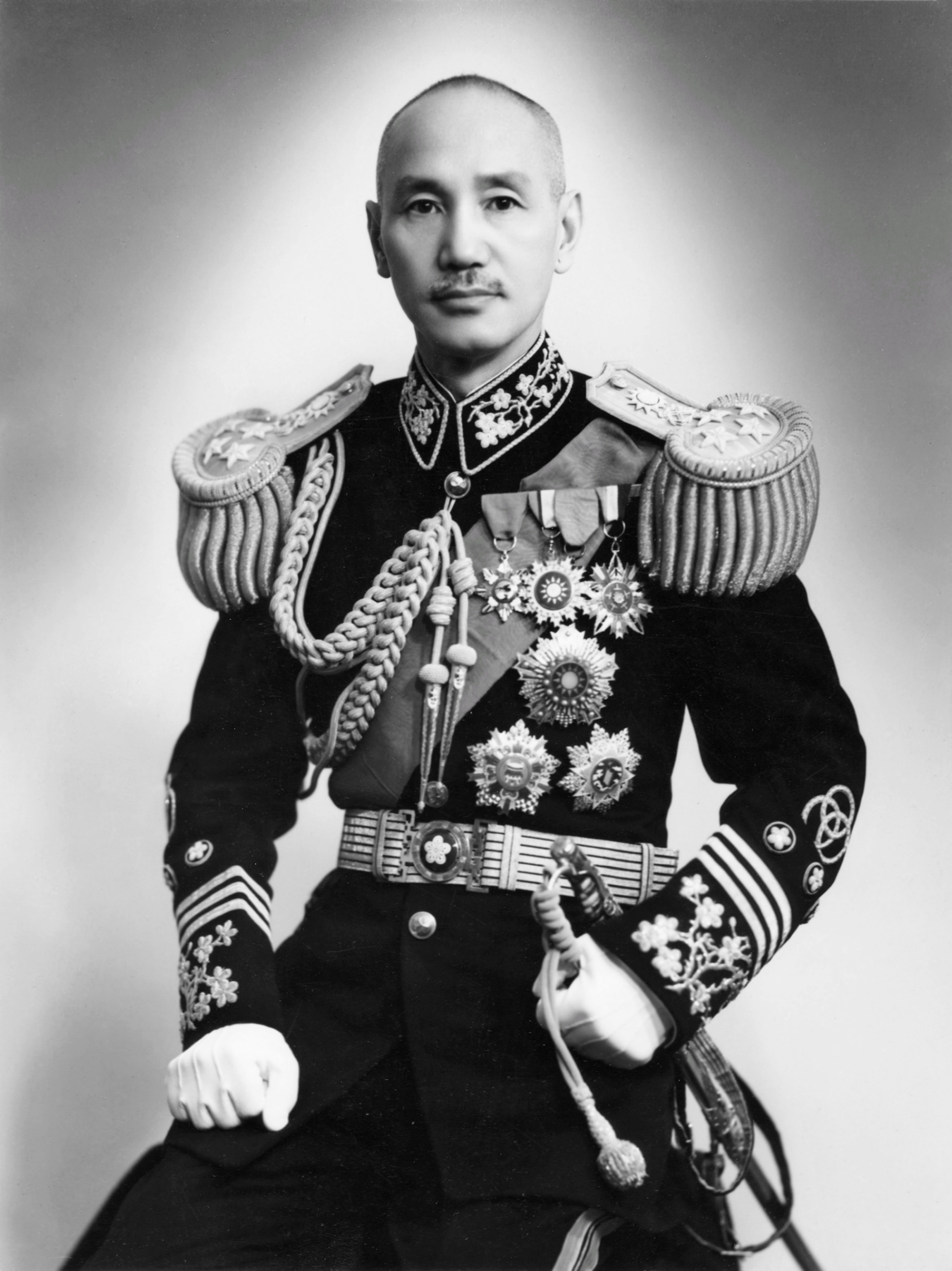
Chiang Kai-shek, c. 1943

Among Kuomintang (KMT)'s conservatives during the Republic of China, Dai Jitao and Hu Hanmin supporters formed the right-wing Western Hills Group in the 1920s.

Chiang Kai-shek initially claimed himself as a 'centrist' in the KMT left-right conflict, but became an anti-communist right-wing after Shanghai massacre. Within the Kuomintang, both right-wing and left-wing factions existed, but the National Revolutionary Army was Chiang's led by the right-wing Kuomintang.

==== People's Republic of China ====
Neoauthoritarianism is a current of political thought that rose in China in the late 1980s and came into ascendancy after the death of Deng Xiaoping; it advocates a powerful state to facilitate market reforms. It has been described as right-wing, classically conservative even though it incorporated some aspects of Marxist–Leninist and Maoist theories. Since Xi took office as CCP general secretary and became the top leader in November 2012, social conservatism has been strengthened, including the traditional gender role for women and accelerated crackdown on LGBTQ+ activism. Within a western context, the Chinese Communist Party does not fit neatly into either left or right-wing traditions; however, it has been characterized by scholars as adapting views and policies closely related to the authoritarian right, particularly on socio-cultural issues as well as foreign policy.

=== France ===
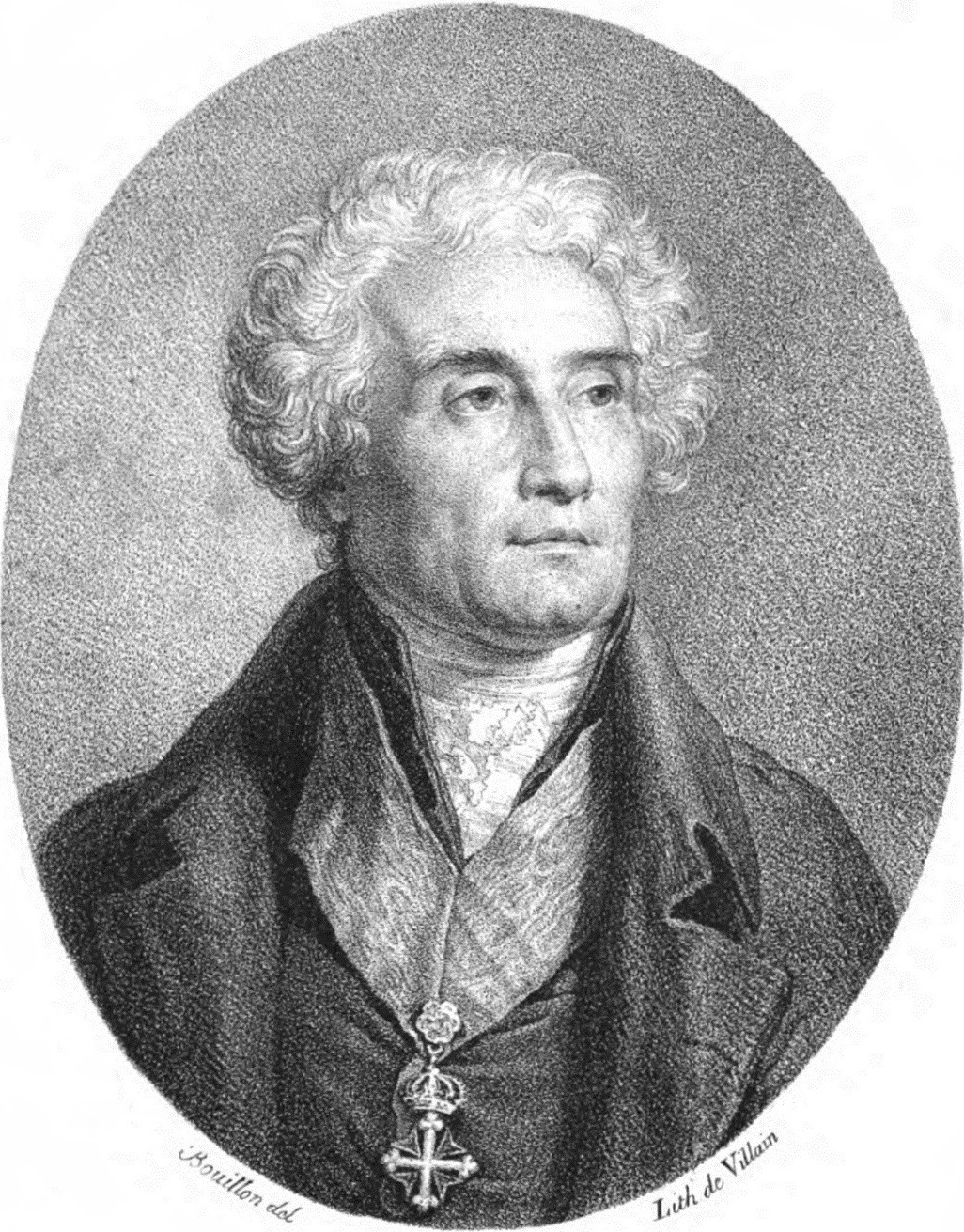
Joseph de Maistre (1753–1821)

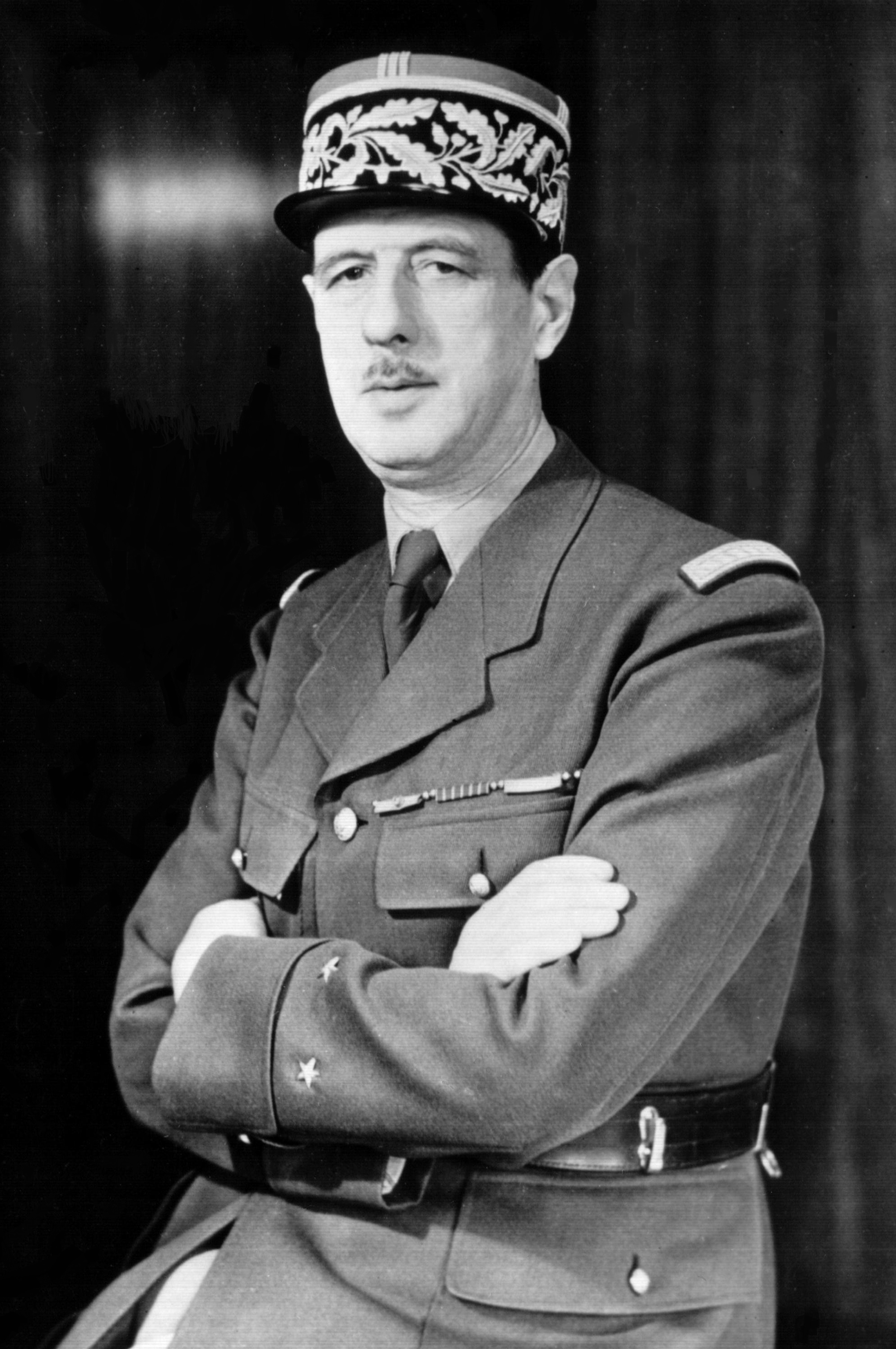
Charles de Gaulle (1890–1970)

Throughout France in the 19th century, the main line dividing the left and right was between supporters of the republic and those of the monarchy, who were often secularist and Catholic respectively.

=== Hungary ===
The dominance of the political right of inter-war Hungary, after the collapse of a short-lived Communist regime, was described by historian István Deák:

Between 1919 and 1944 Hungary was a rightist country. Forged out of a counter-revolutionary heritage, its governments advocated a "nationalist Christian" policy; they extolled heroism, faith, and unity; they despised the French Revolution, and they spurned the liberal and socialist ideologies of the 19th century. The governments saw Hungary as a bulwark against bolshevism and bolshevism's instruments: socialism, cosmopolitanism, and Freemasonry. They perpetrated the rule of a small clique of aristocrats, civil servants, and army officers, and surrounded with adulation the head of the state, the counterrevolutionary Admiral Horthy.

=== India ===
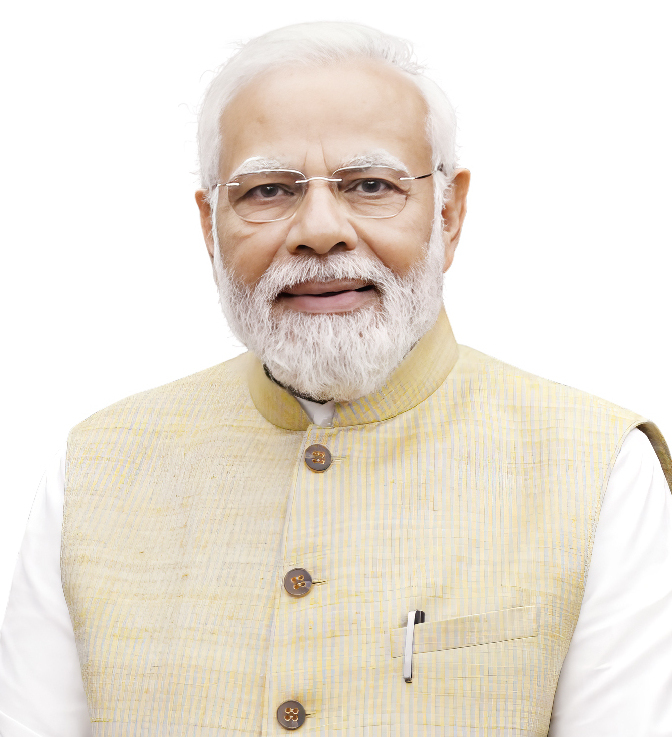
Current prime minister of India, Narendra Modi is often considered as a right-wing leader, who follows the ideology of Hindutva, a right-wing Hindu nationalist political ideology.

Although freedom fighters are favoured, the right-wing tendency to elect or appoint politicians and government officials based on aristocratic and religious ties is common to almost all the states of India. Multiple political parties, however, identify with terms and beliefs which are, by political consensus, right- or left-wing. Certain political parties such as the Bharatiya Janata Party, identify with conservative and nationalist elements. Some, such as the Indian National Congress, take a liberal stance. The Communist Party of India, Communist Party of India (Marxist), and others, identify with left-wing socialist and communist concepts. Other political parties take differing stands, and hence cannot be clearly grouped as the left and the right wing.

=== United Kingdom ===
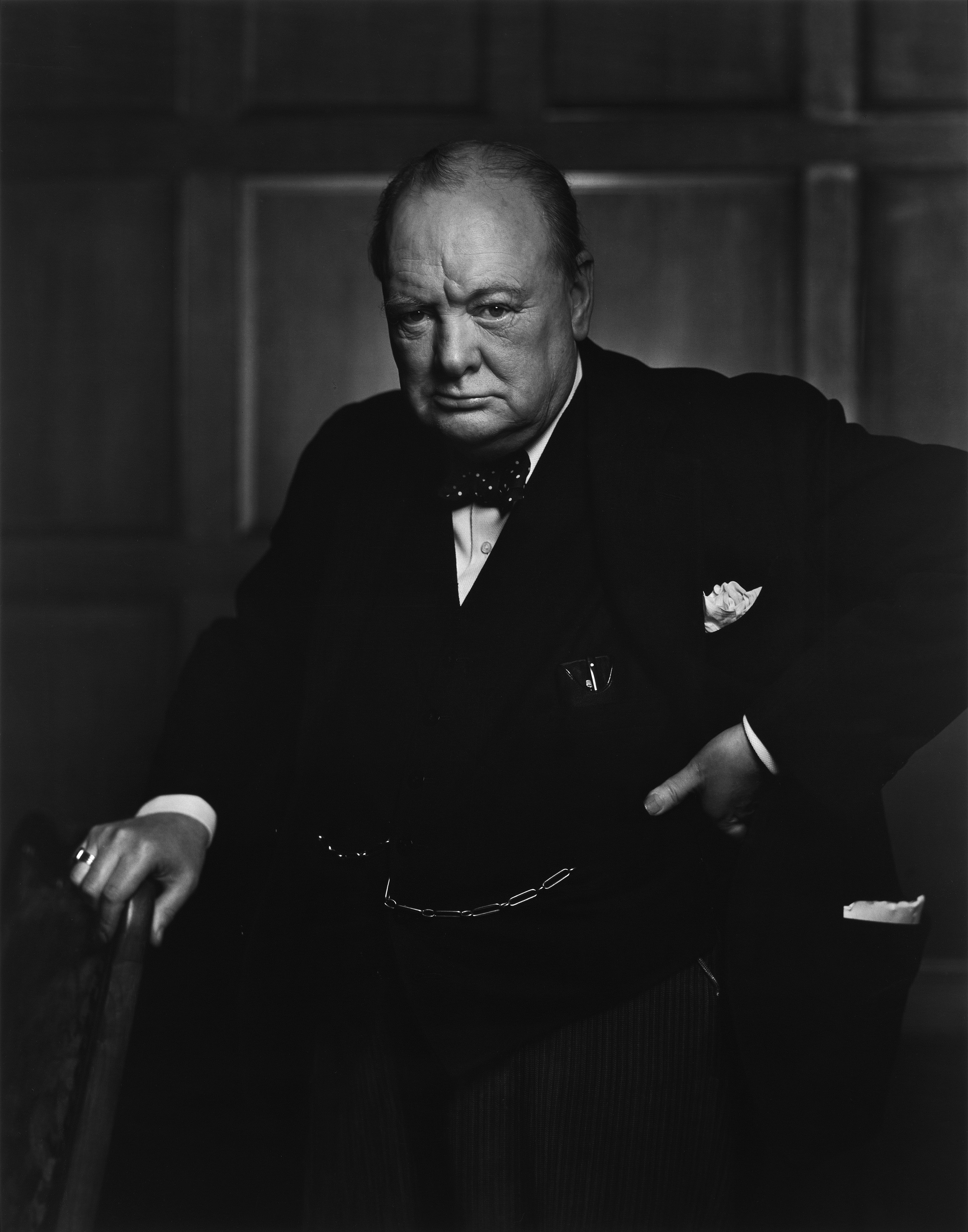
Winston Churchill in 1941

In British politics, the terms right and left came into common use for the first time in the late 1930s during debates over the Spanish Civil War.

The Conservative Party, one of the country's two main political parties, is placed on the centre-right to right-wing of the left–right political spectrum. Reform UK is situated on the right wing of the political spectrum, generally to the Conservative Party's right.

=== United States ===
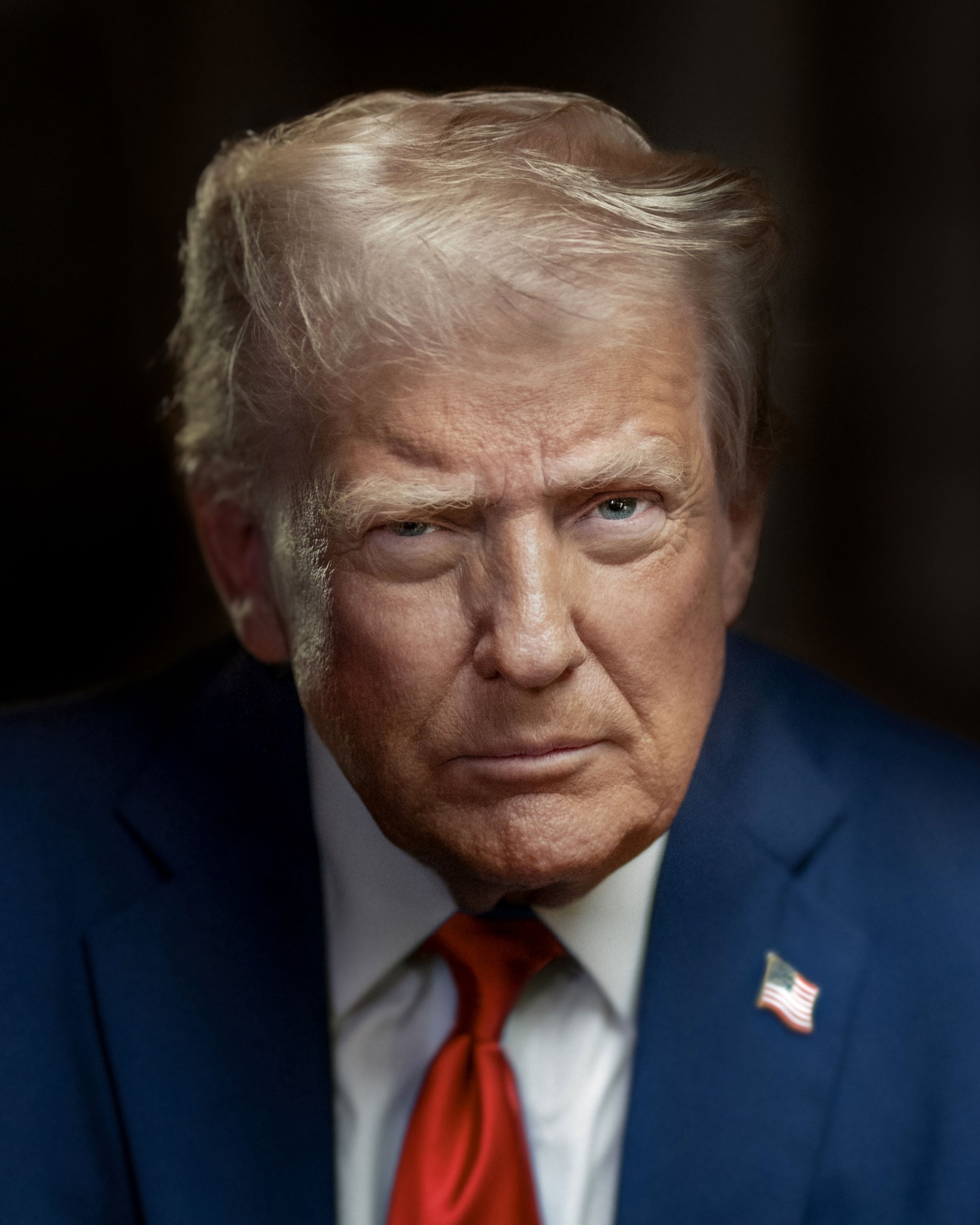
Official presidential portrait of Donald Trump, 2025

In the United States, following the Second World War, social conservatives joined forces with right-wing elements of the Republican Party to gain support among traditionally Democratic voting populations like white southerners and Catholics. This phenomenon became resonantly clear during the 1964 presidential campaign of Barry Goldwater. He appealed to blue-collar and southern voters for his focus on culture, bread and butter issues and opposition to the Civil Rights Act. Ronald Reagan's election to the presidency in 1980 cemented the alliance between the religious right in the United States and social conservatives.

In 2019, the United States populace leaned centre-right, with 37% of Americans self-identifying as conservative, compared to 35% moderate and 24% liberal. This was continuing a decades-long trend of the country leaning centre-right.

The United States Department of Homeland Security defines right-wing extremism in the United States as "broadly divided into those groups, movements, and adherents that are primarily hate-oriented (based on hatred of particular religious, racial or ethnic groups), and those that are mainly anti-government, rejecting federal authority in favour of state or local authority, or rejecting government authority entirely. It may include groups and individuals that are dedicated to a single issue, such as opposition to abortion or immigration".

Right-wing politics in the United States have taken a more populist approach since the election of Donald Trump in 2016. Resentment and anger over worsening economic conditions and competition from imported and illegal labor have been central focuses of the Republican Party. Relatedly, the Democratic Party has lost popularity with working-class voters in recent years.

== Types ==
The meaning of right-wing "varies across societies, historical epochs, and political systems and ideologies". According to The Concise Oxford Dictionary of Politics, in liberal democracies, the political right opposes socialism and social democracy. Right-wing parties include conservatives, Christian democrats, classical liberals, and nationalists, as well as fascists on the far-right.

British academics Noël O'Sullivan and Roger Eatwell divide the right into five types: reactionary, moderate, radical, extreme, and new. Chip Berlet wrote that each of these "styles of thought" are "responses to the left", including liberalism and socialism, which have arisen since the 1789 French Revolution.

1. The reactionary right looks toward the past and is "aristocratic, religious and authoritarian".
2. The moderate right, typified by the writings of Edmund Burke, is tolerant of change, provided it is gradual and accepts some aspects of liberalism, including the rule of law and capitalism, although it sees radical laissez-faire and individualism as harmful to society. The moderate right often promotes nationalism and social welfare policies.
3. Radical right is a descriptive term that was developed after World War II and it was applied to groups and ideologies such as McCarthyism, the John Birch Society, Thatcherism, and the Republikaner Party. Eatwell stresses that this usage of the term has "major typological problems" because it "has also been applied to clearly democratic developments". The radical right includes right-wing populism and various other subtypes.
4. The extreme right has four traits: "1) anti-democracy, 2) ultranationalism, 3) racism, and 4) the strong state".
5. The New Right consists of the liberal conservatives, who stress small government, free markets, and individual initiative.

Other authors make a distinction between the centre-right and the far-right.

- Parties of the centre-right generally support liberal democracy, capitalism, the market economy (though they may accept government regulation to control monopolies), private property rights, and a limited welfare state (for example, government provision of education and medical care). They support conservatism and economic liberalism and oppose socialism and communism.
- By contrast, the phrase "far-right" is used to describe those who favour an absolutist government, which uses the power of the state to support the dominant ethnic group or religion and criminalise other ethnic groups or religions. Typical examples of leaders to whom the far-right label is often applied are: Francisco Franco in Spain, Benito Mussolini in Italy, Adolf Hitler in Nazi Germany, Augusto Pinochet in Chile, and Jorge Rafael Videla in Argentina.

== See also ==
- Alt-right
- Antifeminism
- Centre-right politics
- Far-right politics
  - Far-right subcultures
- List of right-wing political parties
- New Right
- Old Right
- Political violence
- Radical right (Europe)
- Radical right (United States)
- Right realism
- Right-wing antiglobalism
- Right-wing dictatorship
- Right-wing populism
- Right-wing terrorism
