= Zera Fink =

Zera Silver Fink (1902-1979) was an American literary scholar and professor known for his studies on English Renaissance literature and humanism. In the 1940s in his book The Classical Republicans he developed the concept of classical republicanism arguing that Puritan political thought drew inspiration from classical Greece and Rome transmitted through Italian Renaissance theories of mixed government and the stability of the Venetian Republic.

Fink argued that Polybius and Niccolò Machiavelli, the latter in his Discourses on Livy, had a great influence on seventeenth-century "classical republicans" such as James Harrington. The "classical republicans", in turn, influenced eighteenth-century proponents of the Commonwealth.

Fink influenced the political theorist Hannah Arendt in her research for On Revolution as well as Cambridge School historian J. G. A. Pocock, author of The Machiavellian Moment.

== Bibliography ==
=== Works ===
- Fink, Zera Silver (September 1942). "The Theory of the Mixed State and the Development of Milton's Political Thought". PMLA. 57 (3): 705–736.
- Fink, Zera Silver (1945). The Classical Republicans: An Essay in the Recovery of a Pattern of Thought in Seventeenth Century England (1962 ed.). Evanston, Illinois: Northwestern University Press.

=== Sources ===
- Arendt, Hannah (1963). On Revolution. New York, NY: Viking Press.
- Pocock, J. G. A. (October 1965). "Machiavelli, Harrington and English Political Ideologies in the Eighteenth Century". The William and Mary Quarterly. 22 (4). Institute of Early American History and Culture: 549–583. doi:10.2307/1922910. JSTOR 1922910.
