= Cambridge School (intellectual history) =

Movement in the history of political thought

In intellectual history and the history of political thought, the Cambridge School is a loose historiographical movement traditionally associated with the University of Cambridge, where many of those associated with the school held or continue to hold academic positions, including Quentin Skinner, J. G. A. Pocock, Peter Laslett, John Dunn, James Tully, David Runciman, and Raymond Geuss.

== Overview ==
The Cambridge School can broadly be characterised as a historicist or contextualist mode of interpretation, placing primary emphasis on the historical conditions and the intellectual context of the discourse of a given historical era, and opposing the perceived anachronism of conventional methods of interpretation, which it believes often distort the significance of texts and ideas by reading them in terms of distinctively modern understandings of social and political life. In these terms, the Cambridge School is 'idealist' in the sense that it accepts ideas as constitutive elements of human history in themselves, and hence contradicts social-scientific positivism in historiography.

The text often held as the original declaration of the principles of the school is Quentin Skinner's 1969 article 'Meaning and Understanding in the History of Ideas'. Here, Skinner attacks what he describes as two "orthodoxies": "perennialism", the view that philosophers have always debated the same fundamental questions; and the notion that context is irrelevant to a historical understanding of texts, which can be read as self-standing material. In Mark Bevir's words, Skinner and his colleagues "defended the history of political theory against both reductionists who dismissed ideas as mere epiphenomena and canonical theorists who approached texts as timeless philosophical works".

The school has been criticised on a number of fronts. On the one hand, historians working in more materialist contexts such as social history have criticised the school's focus on ideas. Christopher Goto-Jones has argued that the school has developed in an orientalist direction by neglecting non-Western contributions to intellectual history.

== Michael Oakeshott: debates over influence ==
Prior to his death, J.G.A. Pocock called for both "global" contextualism as well as critical examination of the potential "multicultural" contours of such contextualism. Pocock's own contextualism has been linked to Michael Oakeshott, especially after the 1968 publication of a critical essay on the lessons of socio-historical linguistics espoused by the liberal-conservative philosopher. Pocock had already candidly argued in a 1958 essay (published in 1962) that, despite paralleling an Oakeshottian commentary on the unavoidable influences of past society on human utterances, much of the burgeoning contextualist methodology derived from the teachings and efforts of Peter Laslett. In a response to an article on the history of the idea of the Cambridge School, Pocock was more bluntly political: "...in Cambridge during these years [1956-58] I was greatly attracted, though never quite converted, to the aesthetic conservatism of Oakeshott’s contention that the categories of discourse generated by a human society are...so numerous as to be incommensurable and their intimations for one another beyond analytic control."

Pocock mentioned Michael Oakeshott in a concluding passage of the 1965 article, "Machiavelli, Harrington and English Political Ideologies in the Eighteenth Century." The passage warned against wholesale synchronic classification of "neo-Harringtonians" in The Machiavellian Moment as "reactionaries" and their opponents as "conservatives," even in diachronic studies. The passage consisted of summary arguments from an article that Pocock had published the previous year, "Ritual, Language, Power: An Essay on the Apparent Political Meanings of Ancient Chinese Philosophy" for Political Science. Pocock mused that readers would deem it "strange" to find "the conservative party repudiating [the neo-Harringtonian 'schoolbook interpretation of'] history, and the opposition appealing to it...When the adversary by whom he [the conservative party member] is faced is a fundamentalist reactionary, advocating a return to things as (he says) they once were, it is not surprising that the conservative should argue, first, that things in the past were not as the adversary supposes, second, that the whole idea of appeal to the past is out of order. He can achieve the former by means of historical criticism, which is just as likely to be a conservative as a radical technique. The latter he can achieve in either of two ways. Like Hooker and Burke, he can appeal to tradition...or he can have recourse to a hard-headed empiricism, which scouts the whole notion of history as a court of appeal...These two arguments are not as different as they might appear. The ancient Chinese philosopher Hsun Tzu tried to unite them, and in that Oakeshotten isle of Albion they are, of course, found in many combinations."

On a related note, in his 2019 response to the Cambridge School article, Pocock further alluded to his 1975 The Machiavellian Moment as a " 'Cambridge' treatise [authored] in an American setting (suggested by Bernard Bailyn and Caroline Robbins)." This suggestion by Bailyn most likely derived from WMQ editorial comments on Pocock's 1965 article, but any impetus connected to Bailyn for Pocock's seminal study remains a subject of scholarly inquiry.

== The republican position ==
J. G. A. Pocock periodically clarified and updated Cambridge School methodologies. In a 1981 methodological essay, for instance, Pocock critiqued deconstruction, expressed "surprise" at pundits and scholars who "denounced [him] as party to a conspiracy of American ideologues", and attempted to use Raiders of the Lost Ark character interpretations of the Ark of the Covenant to illustrate his approach to history. He thought it "clear that I am not supposing a state of things in which each idiom or paradigm defines a community of persons who speak in its terms and whose thinking is governed by its presuppositions." The aims of reconstructing discourse were to illuminate political thought, not to foreclose the possibility or probability of political thought independent of a given discourse.

In 2004, Pocock expounded on one of his many purposes for contributing to the Cambridge School. Pocock confirmed that "[Quentin] Skinner and I agree in a certain sympathy for the 'positive,' or as will appear, the 'republican' position." The latter "position" usually, but not always, signified modes of government rather than, for example, industrial and post-industrial North American "progressive business" or collectivism in stateless societies and subcultures. Mira Siegelberg maintains that the ideas of Hannah Arendt, rather than serving "as a source for the normative implications of his [later] argument—as some of his critics have claimed—Pocock placed himself in critical relation to her valorization of civic republicanism."

Both Pocock and Arendt claimed that Zera Fink's 1945 book on a "Venetian vogue" for "stability" by mixed government, and the 1942 article in which Fink examined the Discorsi passages translated and quoted in the works of James Harrington, partially germinated their research. Pocock especially credited Fink for beginning a study on Englishmen "impressed by the stability of Venetian constitutional reforms" and the classical republicanism that spawned such reforms.

== Rejoinder to critiques of Cambridge School contextualism by J. G. A. Pocock ==
In 1995, historian Bernard Bailyn delivered a lecture at La Trobe University, published in Quadrant as "Context in History," on critical appraisals of contextualism and on ideas that transcended such contexts. Gordon S. Wood cited and recapitulated Bailyn's arguments on "Context in History" in reviews for The Weekly Standard and Washington Examiner. In 1996, J. G. A. Pocock rejoined their criticism in "Concepts and Discourses: A Difference in Culture[?]."

Pocock explained why Cambridge School publications should not be "homogenized" as the history of ideas, conceptual history, or even the history of discourses. According to Pocock, "long ago, I decided that I would no longer describe what I was doing by the then conventional term 'history of ideas' on the grounds that, while ideas obviously formed themselves in the human mind, the term by itself did not indicate the concrete historical form in which ideas exhibited themselves as undergoing continuity and change in history [perhaps grounding as continuity and change in history]. Ideen and Begriffe [glossed in English as ideas and concepts] are of course not necessarily identical, but I think the same difficulty may arise regarding a history of concepts as regarding a history of ideas. That is, scholars in this field shall find themselves examining a history of language, of vocabularies, grammars, rhetorics, and their usages, for the most part in written and printed form, in which words and usages convey concepts from mind to mind...I am not saying that concepts are epiphenomenal or unreal; and it is not my business to say that language is the only ultimate reality."

For Pocock, the attempt to draft a " ' history of the concept of the state,' " was a worthwhile endeavor. He was confident that "there must have been a tract of time in which locally specific historical agents continuously employed language in which cognates of the word state—alternatively, terminology from some other language that one can regularly translate, and justify oneself in translating, by that word and its cognates—were used in ways that permit historians to establish a developmental or dialectical history of conceptualization accompanying the history of language usage as one of its effects. We may then find that some concept of the state took shape over the period we are studying."

For conceptual history and the history of ideas, mutually agreeable translations were important, and Pocock seemed to require common lexical cognates and/or epistemic justification to "regularly translate." Otherwise, "we are imposing our interpretation and our language on historical actors inhabiting a language world other than ours, and saying that they must, ideally, be supposed to have inhabited a world that our language defines." There were "dangers" in, for instance, using the "word state as a translation of the Greek polis [πόλις], the Chinese kuo [郭], the Latin civitas or imperium or res publica, the early modern English commonwealth, the Florentine stato, the French état, or the English estate." Translations of all of the foregoing as "state" was "difficult to do without imposing an ideal construct—which is to say, a body of our own concepts—upon history." In the case of the Chinese kuo [郭], the imposition could potentially be an example of Eurocentrism, despite graphemes and semiotics common to all languages.

J. G. A. Pocock still held to his example of the " 'history of the concept of the state' " as possible with common lexical cognates and/or epistemic justification to "regularly translate" the concept of "state" within a select set of comparable and compound, albeit shifting, contexts. He suggested that "Sattelzeit [the saddle time and gradual or accelerated shift to an epoch threshold of modernities] as Professor Koselleck has described," itself substantiated "the history of concepts as a feature of, and as exhibited within, an ongoing history of discourses arranged against each other in constant and continuing debate." Conversely, scholars that "concern themselves with a history of contexts and texts...set up a synchronically existing language-world in order to see how it was being used at the moment and how it was being changed in the short run." Despite this apparent synchronic emphasis, these adherents of the Cambridge School "are as heavily committed to the dynamic as they are to the static." Pocock acknowledged, though, "that they are better at establishing the character of innovations in the synchronic than at tracing the more long-term pattern of changes in the diachronic."

In dialectical fashion, both the history of ideas and conceptual history, in turn, propelled the Cambridge School into studying ideas. A given idea had to be evaluated within "changing contexts in which it had been used; the changing ways in which, and purposes for which, it had been used; and the changing freights of implication, assumption, and other modes of significance that had, from time to time, been attached to it." His conclusion reiterated that the history of ideas, conceptual history, and history of discourses "can be confronted, compared, and combined, but not homogenized."

In response to methodological criticisms of Cambridge School contexts in The Machiavellian Moment, by Bailyn and others, J.G.A. Pocock disclosed that the opprobrium had precipitated his multivolume Barbarism and Religion series, published from 1999 to 2015, on historiography drafted during the Enlightenment and its benefaction to the history of political thought. In "Theory in History: Problems in Context and Narrative," Pocock posed the most common question elicited by the application of contextualism: "What exactly are the conditions it specifies, and why does it specify these and not others?" For Pocock, "this question becomes all the more pressing as we enter the realms of practice and history, where the conditions under which, and the contexts in which, we operate can never be defined with finality...the historian has begun to resemble a post-Burkean moderate conservative, reminding us that there is always more going on than we can comprehend at any one moment and convert into either theory or practice. One has become something of a political theorist in one’s own right, advancing, and inviting others to explore, the proposition that political action and political society are always to be understood in a context of historical narrative."

Pocock accepted the Bailyn-Wood criticism of contextualist pasts for republican thought. He further suggested that scholars study "historiography as itself a branch of political thought and theory, literature and discourse," casting this methodological criticism as an argument for a given "political theory" over another "political theory" or a variation of the same "political theory." He reflected on historians, past and present, "who study and narrate what goes on in this world; it is possible that there may be a 'political theory' which addresses the same phenomena."

== Ideas in Context ==
In 1984, Cambridge University Press published Philosophy in History: Essays in the Historiography of Philosophy, a collection of lectures delivered for a 1982-83 conference sequence at Johns Hopkins University. The collection became the inaugural volume of the publisher's Ideas in Context series, with an editorial board that included Quentin Skinner, Richard Rorty, and J. B. Schneewind. The introductory essay served both as an introduction to the volume and the Ideas in Context series itself. Although signed by all three editors, Richard Fisher argues that the statement of purpose was "largely written" by Rorty and "tonally rather different to much of what has followed." That stated, Quentin Skinner remained as general editor for more than two decades. The second volume of the series was Virtue, Commerce, and History: Essays in Political Thought and History, Chiefly in the Eighteenth Century, a collection of essays by J. G. A. Pocock that periodically deployed Saussurean langue and parole in the study of contexts for ideas, presaging the sixth volume in the series, The Language of Political Theory in Early-Modern Europe. Pocock never served as a principal editor for the series.

The preface to the 1984 collection, again signed by Skinner, Rorty, and Schneewind, expressed gratitude for support, both scholarly and financial, from Robert L. Payton. Payton was the former United States Ambassador to Cameroon, a former college and university President, and a trustee for Editorial Projects in Education, the organization that launched The Chronicle of Higher Education. In 1976, he resigned from Hofstra University after scathing criticism for perpetuating a university-wide deficit. Only months after the resignation, however, Payton authored a New York Times article calling for increased fundraising, mergers, and partnerships with "business" in order to maintain and expand scholarly endeavors as well as institutions. Nearly a decade later, Payton was appointed President of the philanthropic Exxon Education Foundation. The preface indicated that Payton "did everything a patient and generous friend could do in assisting us at every stage of our venture. His encouragement and faith in the project remained cheering and constant through all the changes in our plans." The Exxon Education Foundation, spearheaded by Payton, had previously funded the Johns Hopkins University lecture sequence. The foundation continues to sponsor the book series, while Cambridge University Press promotes sustainability and energy saving in academic publishing.

Despite financial and philanthropic continuities, contributors to a 2014 special issue dedicated to the book series in the Journal of the History of Ideas, entitled "Ideas in Context at 100," observed substantial changes in content and scope. Contributors also noted that a number of studies in the series did not strictly adhere to Cambridge School methodologies. Instead, these books collectively represented a number of alterations and innovations in contextualism since the 1980s. The editorial introduction to the special issue acknowledged that the "Cambridge School's shaping themes [were] reflected in many of the monographs in 'Ideas in Context'---a focus on the history of political thought, concern with the career of republicanism and its various ideological challengers, a tendency to study secular political ideas in isolation from religion, preoccupation with early modern Europe and a predilection for a canon of Western European and English authors situated within a thick contextual web of arguments, languages, and texts." But soon after publication of The Language of Political Theory in Early-Modern Europe "the series rapidly expanded to embrace broader chronologies, themes, domains of intellectual endeavor, and territories." Similarly, the relationship of "Ideas in Context" to the "methodological concerns most closely associated with the Cambridge School...have tended to govern more in the spirit than in the letter of the many distinguished works that constitute Ideas in Context."

Christopher Celenza added that the "Ideas in Context" series included "field-defining synthetic works by senior scholars (Peter Novick's That Noble Dream and Dorothy Ross's The Origins of American Social Science); innovative studies that quickly became canonical (David Armitage's The Ideological Origins of the British Empire); books by renowned scholars setting out on a new, trail-blazing path (G.E.R. Lloyd's Adversaries and Authorities); volumes that arose out of conferences or lecture series (Philosophy in History); collections of essays around a single important theme (Renaissance Civic Humanism: Reappraisals and Reflections, ed. James Hankins) and numerous first books." Celenza defined the "essential mission" of the "Ideas in Context" series as providing "context for the thinkers under study (institutional situation, biography, and immediate intellectual tradition) and, in so doing, reaches conclusions that scrutiny of their texts alone (and especially only of the arguments of their texts) would not have allowed."

== See also ==
- Annales school
- Cambridge School of historiography, which deals with the British Empire and does not overlap with intellectual history
- Conceptual history
- The Cambridge History of Political Thought
- The Foundations of Modern Political Thought
