= J. H. Burns =

Scottish historian

- Born: James Henderson Burns; 10 November 1921; Linlithgow, West Lothian
- Died: 4 November 2012 (aged 90)
- Spouse: Yvonne Birnie (m. 1947)

Academic background
- Education: George Watson's College; University of Edinburgh; Balliol College, Oxford
- Thesis: Theories of a Limited Monarchy in Sixteenth-Century Scotland (1952)

Academic work
- Discipline: History
- Sub-discipline: Medieval and modern political thought Jeremy Bentham
- Institutions: University College London

James Henderson Burns FBA (10 November 1921 – 4 November 2012) was a Scottish historian of medieval and modern political thought who also studied utilitarianism and Jeremy Bentham.

He was born in Linlithgow, West Lothian, the son of a manager of a paper mill. He was educated at George Watson's College (1932–40) before attending Edinburgh University, where he was awarded a BA (first-class honours). Due to poor eyesight, he was declared unfit for military service in the Second World War, and so worked as a sub-editor for the news department of the BBC. Abandoning his membership of the Communist Party, Burns converted to Roman Catholicism during the war and from 1950 he contributed to the Innes Review, which analysed the role of the Catholic Church in Scottish history.

After the war, he studied PPE at Balliol College, Oxford, for which he was awarded another BA First (1947). Also in 1947, he married Yvonne Birnie and was appointed lecturer in political theory at Aberdeen University. He was awarded a Ph.D. in 1952 for his thesis, 'Theories of Limited Monarchy in Sixteenth-Century Scotland'.

He took up a readership in the history of political thought at University College London and in 1961 he was the founding editor of The Collected Works of Jeremy Bentham, a position he held until 1979. Three of the first four volumes were co-edited by Burns and, together with H. L. A. Hart, Burns contributed to the major reassessment of Bentham's influence on jurisprudence and political philosophy.

Burns was appointed professor of the history of political thought at UCL in 1967 and he was also the head of the history department (1970–75). He edited The Cambridge History of Medieval Political Thought c. 350–c. 1450 (1988) and The Cambridge History of Political Thought 1450–1700 (1991), which are his most widely read works.

Burns retired from UCL in 1986 and was appointed the John Hinkley Visiting professor at Johns Hopkins University, the result of his friendship with J. G. A. Pocock. In 1992 he was elected a Fellow of the British Academy.

== Works ==
- 'Three Scots Catholic Critics of George Buchanan', Innes Review, 1 (1950), pp. 92–109.
- 'The Scotland of John Major', Innes Review, 2 (1951), pp. 65–76.
- 'John Major in Scotland', Scottish Historical Review, 31 (1952), p. 98.
- (with Saul Rose), 'Ά Scottish Constituency', in The British General Election of 1951, ed. David Butler (London: Macmillan, 1952), pp. 184–97.
- 'New Light on John Major', Innes Review, 5 (1954), pp. 83–200.
- 'Knox and Bullinger', Scottish Historical Review, 34 (1955), pp. 90–1.
- 'John Ireland and "The Meroure of Wyssdome"', Innes Review,, 4 (1955), pp. 77–97.
- 'Market and Fair in Medieval Haddington', Transactions of the East Lothian Antiquarian and Field Naturalists' Society, 5 (1955), pp. 42–3.
- (contributor to) 'The Ordination of John Knox: A Symposium', Innes Review, 6 (1955), pp. 99–106, at pp. 102–3.
- 'The Political Ideas of the Scottish Reformation', Aberdeen University Review, 36 (1956), pp. 251–68.
- 'An English View of Federalism in 1829', Political Studies, 4 (1956), pp. 312–15.
- 'Mr Scott on Freedom and Unfreedom', Political Studies, 5 (1957), pp. 81–3.
- 'J.S. Mill and Democracy, 1829–61.1', Political Studies, 5 (1957), pp. 158–75.
- 'J.S. Mill and Democracy, 1829–61. II', Political Studies, 5 (1957), pp. 281–9.
- 'John Knox and Revolution, 1558', History Today, 8 (1958), pp. 565–73.
- Ninian Winzet and the Defence of the Faith in Scotland (Glasgow: Catholic Truth Society of Scotland, 1959).
- 'J.S. Mill and the Term "Social Science"', Journal of the History of Ideas, 20 (1959), pp. 431–2.
- 'Utilitarianism and Democracy', Philosophical Quarterly, 9 (1959), pp. 168–71.
- 'Sovereignty and Constitutional Law in Bodin', Political Studies, 7 (1959), pp. 174–7.
- 'The Political Background of the [Scottish] Reformation, 1513-1625', Innes Review, 10 (1959), pp. 199–236.
- ' "Winzerus": A Forgotten Political Writer', Journal of the History of Ideas, 21 (1959), pp. 124–30.
- 'The Scottish Committees of the House of Commons, 1948-1959', Political Studies, 8 (1960), pp. 272–8.
- 'Scottish Churchmen and the Council of Basle, Part One', Innes Review, 13 (1962), pp. 1–53.
- 'Scottish Churchmen and the Council of Basle, Part Two', Innes Review, 13 (1962), pp. 157–89.
- (with A. Cobban), 'Rousseau's Du contrat social: Some Problems of Translation', Political Studies, 10 (1962), pp. 203–7.
- 'Bolingbroke and the Concept of Constitutional Government', Political Studies, 10 (1962), pp. 264–76.
- 'The Political Background of the Reformation, 1513-1625', in Essays on the Scottish Reformation, ed. D. McRoberts (Glasgow: Burns, 1962), pp. 1–38.
- Jeremy Bentham and University College (London: Athlone Press of the University of London, 1962).
- Scottish Churchmen and the Council of Basle (Glasgow: Burns, 1962).
- 'The Conciliarist Tradition in Scotland', Scottish Historical Review, 42 (1963), pp. 89–104.
- 'Catholicism in Defeat: Ninian Winzet 1519-1592', History Today, 16 (1966), pp. 788–95.
- 'Bentham and the French Revolution', Transactions of the Royal Historical Society, 5th series 16 (1966), pp. 95–114.
- 'The Fabric of Felicity: The Legislator and the Human Condition' (London: H.K. Lewis for University College London, 1967).
- 'Notes on the History of the Bentham Family', in The Correspondence of Jeremy Bentham, Vol. I, 1752-78, ed. T. L. S. Sprigge (London: The Athlone Press of the University of London, 1968), pp. xxxv-xxxi.
- 'J.S. Mill and Democracy, 1829-61', in Mill: A Collection of Critical Essays, ed. J.B. Schneewind (New York: Anchor Books, 1968), pp. 280–328.
- (ed. with H. L. A. Hart), An Introduction to the Principles of Morals and Legislation [The Collected Works of Jeremy Bentham] (London: The Athlone Press Press of the University of London, 1970).
- 'Scotland and England: Culture and Nationality, 1500-1800', in Britain and the Netherlands, 4: Mettropolis, Dominion and Province, ed. J. S. Bromley and E. H. Kossmann (The Hague: Martinus Nijhoff, 1971), pp. 17–41.
- 'The Rights of Man since the Reformation', in An Introduction to the Study of Human Rights, ed. Sir F. Vallat (London: Europa Publications, 1971), pp. 16–30.
- 'Utilitarianism and Democracy', in Utilitarianism [by] John Stuart Mill with Critical Essays, ed. S. Gorovitz (Indianapolis and New York: Bobbs-Merrill, 1971), pp. 269–72.
- The Bentham Project', in Editing Texts of the Victorian Period, ed. J.D. Baird (Toronto: A.M. Hakkert for The Committee for the Conference on Editorial Problems, 1972), pp. 73–87.
- 'Bentham on Sovereignty: An Exploration', Northern Ireland Legal Quarterly, 24 (1973), pp. 399–116.
- 'Bentham's Critique of Political Fallacies', in Jeremy Bentham: Ten Critical Essays, ed. B. Parekh (London: Frank Cass, 1974), pp. 154–67.
- 'Bentham on Sovereignty: An Exploration', in Bentham and Legal Theory, ed. M.H. James (Belfast: Northern Ireland Legal Quarterly, 1974), pp. 133–50.
- 'The Light of Reason: Philosophical History in the Two Mills', in James and John Stuart Mill: Papers of the Centenary Conference, ed. J.M. Robson and M. Laine (Toronto and Buffalo: University of Toronto Press, 1976), pp. 3–20.
- (ed. with H. L. A. Hart), A Comment on the Commentaries and A Fragment on Government [The Collected Works of Jeremy Bentham] (London: The Athlone Press of the University of London, 1977).
- 'The Fabric of Felicity: The Legislator and the Human Condition', in The Study of Politics: A Collection of Inaugural Lectures, ed. P. King (London: Frank Cass, 1977), pp. 207–24.
- 'Dreams and Destinations: Jeremy Bentham in 1828', The Bentham Newsletter, 1 (1978), pp. 21–3.
- 'Ex uno plura? The British Experience', in Federalism: History and Current Significance of a Form of Government, ed. J.C. Boogman and G.N. van der Plaat (The Hague: Martinus Nijhoff, 1980), pp. 189–21.
- 'Politia regalis et optima: The Political Ideas of John Mair', History of Political Thought, 2 (1981), pp. 31-61.
- (ed. with F. Rosen) Constitutional Code, Vol. 1 (The Collected Works of Jeremy Bentham (Oxford: Clarendon Press, 1983).
- 'Jus gladii and jurisdictio: Jacques Almai and John Locke', Historical Journal (1983), 26, pp. 369–74.
- 'St German, Gerson, Aquinas and Ulpian', History of Political Thought, 4 (1983), pp. 443–9.
- 'Jeremy Bentham: From Radical Enlightenment to Philosophic Radicalism', The Bentham Newsletter, 8 (1984), pp. 4–14.
- 'Fortescue and the Political Theory of dominium', Historical Journal, 28 (1985), pp. 777–97.
- 'Scottish Philosophy and the Science of Legislation', in Scottish Philosophers and the Specialisation of Knowledge (Royal Society of Edinburgh Occasional Papers, 2–6, 1985), pp. 11–29.
- 'From "Polite Learning" to "Useful Knowledge"', History Today, 36 (April 1986), pp. 21–9.
- 'Clio as a Governess: Lessons in History, 1798', History Today, 36 (August 1986), pp. 10–15.
- Absolutism: The History of an Idea (The Creighton Trust Lecture 1986), London: University of London, 1987).
- (ed.) The Cambridge History of Medieval Political Thought, c.350-c.1450 (Cambridge University Press, 1988).
- 'Bentham and Blackstone: A Lifetime's Dialectic', Utilitas, 1 (1989), pp. 22–40.
- 'Utilitarianism and Reform: Social Theory and Social Change, 1750—1800', Utilitas, 1 (1989), pp. 211–25.
- 'The Idea of Absolutism', in Absolutism in Seventeenth-Century Europe, ed. J. Miller (London: Macmillan, 1990), pp. 21–42.
- 'John Ireland: Theology and Public Affairs in the Late Fifteenth Century', Innes Review, 41 (1990), pp. 151–79
- 'Bentham and Blackstone: A Lifetime's Dialectic', in Empire and Revolutions, ed. G. J. Schochet (Proceedings of the Folger Institute Center for the History of British Political Thought, Vol. 6, 1990), pp. 22–40.
- (ed. with M. Goldie), The Cambridge History of Political Thought 1450—1700 (Cambridge University Press, 1991).
- 'Thomas More: A Saint for What Season?', The Newman, no. 22 (1991), pp. 2–6.
- 'Conciliarism, Papalism, and Power, 1511-1518', in The Church and Sovereignty c.500-1918: Essays in Honour of Michael Wilks, ed. D. Wood (Oxford: Basil Blackwell for the Ecclesiastical History Society, 1991), pp. 409–28.
- 'Viewpoint' [on Michael Oakeshott], Cambridge Review, 112 (1991), pp. 133–6.
- Lordship, Kingship and Empire: The Idea of Monarchy, 1400-1525 (The Carlyle Lectures 1988) (Oxford: Clarendon Press, 1992).
- 'The "Monarchia" of Antonio de' Roselli (1390-1466): Text, Context and Controversy', Proceedings of the Eighth International Congress of Medieval Canon Law, San Diego 1988 (Series C: Subsidia 9, 1992), pp. 321–51.
- 'George Buchanan and the Anti-Monarchomachs', in Political Discourse in Early-Modern Britain, ed. N. Phillipson and Q. Skinner (Cambridge University Press, 1993), pp. 3–22.
- 'David Ure (1749-1793) "Breadth of mind and accuracy of observation" ', Glasgow Naturalist, 22 (1993), pp. 259–75.
- 'Nature and Natural Authority in Bentham', Utilitas, 5 (1993), pp. 209–19.
- 'Conciliarism' in Dictionary of Scottish Church History and Theology, ed. N.M. de S. Cameron et al. (Edinburgh: T. and T. Clark, 1993), pp. 201–2.
- 'George Buchanan and the anti-Monarchomachs', in Scots and Britons: Scottish Political Thought and the Union of 1603, ed. R.A. Mason (Cambridge University Press, 1994), pp. 138–58.
- 'Jacques Almain on dominium: A Neglected Text', in Politics, Ideology and the Law in Early Modern Eu and Woodbridge, ed. A. E. Bakos (University of Rochester Press, 1995), pp. 149–58.
- The True Law of Kingship: Concepts of Monarchy in Early Modern Scotland (Oxford: Clarendon Press, 1996).
- 'John Knox: Scholastic and Canonistic Echoes', in John Knox and the British Reformations, ed. R.A. Mason (Aldershot: Scolar/Ashgate, 1998), pp. 117–29.
