= The Cambridge History of Political Thought =

Book series by Cambridge University Press

- Country: United Kingdom
- Language: English
- Genre: History of political thought
- Publisher: Cambridge University Press
- Published: 1988–2011

The Cambridge History of Political Thought is a series of history books published by Cambridge University Press covering the history of Western political thought from classical antiquity to the twentieth century.

J. G. A. Pocock has noted that the series' volume on the early modern period focuses on a specific, "coherent and idiosyncratically Latin and Western" understanding of political thought.

== Contents ==
Title	Year	Editors	Pages	ISBN
The Cambridge History of Greek and Roman Political Thought	2000	Christopher Rowe, Malcolm Schofield, Simon Harrison, and Melissa Lane	766	978-0521481366
The Cambridge History of Medieval Political Thought, c. 350 – c. 1450	1988	J. H. Burns	818	978-0521243247
The Cambridge History of Political Thought, 1450–1700	1991	J. H. Burns and Mark Goldie	812	978-0521247160
The Cambridge History of Eighteenth-Century Political Thought	2006	Mark Goldie and Robert Wokler	936	978-0521374224
The Cambridge History of Nineteenth-Century Political Thought	2011	Gareth Stedman Jones and Gregory Claeys	1,162	978-0521430562
The Cambridge History of Twentieth-Century Political Thought	2003	Terence Ball and Richard Bellamy	768	978-0521563543

== See also ==
- The Foundations of Modern Political Thought
