= The Machiavellian Moment =

1975 book by J. G. A. Pocock

The Machiavellian Moment: Florentine Political Thought and the Atlantic Republican Tradition
- Cover of the first edition
- Author: J. G. A. Pocock
- Language: English
- Genre: History
- Publisher: Princeton University Press
- Publication date: 1975
- Publication place: United States
- Pages: 602 pp.
- ISBN: 0-691-11472-2

The Machiavellian Moment is a work of intellectual history by J. G. A. Pocock (Princeton University Press, 1975). It posits a connection between republican thought in early 16th-century Florence, English-Civil War Britain, and the American Revolution.

A "Machiavellian moment" is that moment when a new republic first confronts the problem of maintaining the stability of its ideals and institutions. Machiavellian thought was a response to a series of crises facing early 16th-century Florence, in which a seemingly virtuous state was on the cusp of destruction. In response, Machiavelli sought to revive classical republican ideals. Works like The Prince and those of some pre-English Civil War thinkers and a group of American Revolutionary personalities all faced similar such moments and offered related sets of answers. In 2004, Pocock disclosed that, during the writing of both The Machiavellian Moment and The Foundations of Modern Political Thought by Quentin Skinner, "we were in regular correspondence, and the title of my work was in fact suggested by Skinner." Both works have been described as seminal in shaping the Cambridge School.

== Background ==
=== "Machiavelli, Harrington, and English Political Ideologies in the Eighteenth Century" ===
In 1965, J. G. A. Pocock published "Machiavelli, Harrington, and English Political Ideologies in the Eighteenth Century" in the William and Mary Quarterly. In this article, Pocock analyzed Machiavelli's focus on armed militancy in the Discorsi as a recourse for temporal stability in polities subject to the whims of fortuna. In Pocock's estimation, "Polybius was the most representative among the ancients and Machiavelli--the Machiavelli of the Discourses--among the moderns." In the 1656 The Commonwealth of Oceana, James Harrington retained armed militancy as secondary to landholdings for temporal stability in polities: "Harrington conveys what was to be perhaps his chief gift to eighteenth-century political thought: the discovery of a means whereby the county [from "county assemblies"] freeholder could equate himself with the Greco-Roman polites and profess a wholly classical and Aristotelian doctrine of the relations between property, liberty, and power...Harrington's citizen may or may not be an entrepreneur, but he is primarily a freeholder...the right to bear arms [from Machiavelli's Discorsi], and the propertied independence enabling one to provide one's own, become the tests of citizenship in Harrington's England as they had been in Athens or Rome." Pocock nuanced his previous interpretations of James Harrington's writings and allowed for the possibility of freeholder entrepreneurship, but still held that "government" was more manifest than "trade" in his ideas.

During the Second World War and more than a decade before contributions to this research field by Pocock, philologist and literary scholar Zera S. Fink demonstrated that Polybian and Machiavellian ideas, the latter primarily in the Discorsi, had been transmitted into (what Fink described as) "the classical republican" minds of seventeenth-century England—one in particular, Fink averred, was none other than James Harrington. Both Pocock and Hannah Arendt claimed that Fink's 1945 book on a "Venetian vogue" for "stability" by mixed government, and the 1942 article in which Fink examined the Discorsi passages translated and quoted in the works of James Harrington, partially germinated their research. Arendt cited Fink for On Revolution. Pocock similarly credited Fink for beginning a study on Englishmen "impressed by the stability of Venetian constitutional reforms" and the classical republicanism that spawned such reforms.

Pocock wished to further research and elaborate on this project: "...what I propose to do is investigate the significance in the eighteenth century of a current of ideas that stems mainly from James Harrington, but can be traced additionally to the seventeenth-century theorists studied some years ago by Z. S. Fink under the name of the 'classical republicans'...Caroline Robbins' The Eighteenth-Century Commonwealthman illustrated] how regularly recourse was made, throughout the century, to a group of writers essentially the same as Fink's Venetian theorists." Pocock, more than Fink and Hannah Arendt, critically crystallized a purpose of Machiavelli's Discorsi. The Machiavellian promotion of armed militancy became a possible recourse for temporal stability in polities, connected not only to "reversals of fortune," but to "revolution" as a technical problem solved only by multiple approaches to mixed government.

The remainder of J.G.A. Pocock's article appraised politicos that he dubbed the "neo-Harringtonians." Pocock charted the consequences of an "increased awareness of the role of commerce and finance as historical determinants." It was the eighteenth-century "neo-Harringtonians" who narrated a "Gothic commonwealth of freeholders...an economy of masters and servants, defined mainly in agrarian and traditional terms," that had been lost to the early modern "corruption" of "money in government: of public finance...[and] a well-financed court bureaucracy... a Marxist might say that this was a [neo-]mercantilist rather than an entrepreneurial consciousness, if that were not probably revisionism."

The "neo-Harringtonians," extant dissidents against the "mercantile court" and "coffeehouse intellectuals living by their wit," began to deride "standing army" excursions against the landed gentry in their remonstrances, ostensibly "to win support from country gentlemen discontented with the progress of court government." The "neo-Harringtonians" demanded the replacement of this "instrument of corruption" with "an ancient institution known as the militia...where Harrington contrasted the republic of armed proprietors with the feudal combination of monarchy and aristocracy, the neo-Harringtonians contrasted it with the professional army maintained by the executive power." Pocock concluded that "if the armed force of the nation is embodied only in this form [a militia], there can be no threat to public liberty or the public purse; and the proprietor's liberty is guaranteed as much by his right to be the sole fighter in his own defense as by his ultimate right to cast a vote in his own government...it was a well-watered soil on which the ideas of Montesquieu fell, and out of which some of them grew."

=== Introduction to the New Princeton Classics Edition ===
In 2016, historian Richard Whatmore outlined a "brief and partial history of the writing of The Machiavellian Moment." In so doing, Whatmore had "been aided by a number of intellectual historians, including Pocock himself." Between 1968 and 1974, Quentin Skinner and J. G. A. Pocock corresponded over their respective works. Although Pocock's letters have since been lost, Skinner proffered copies of his side of the exchange.

== Summary/content ==
Pocock divided the book into three sections:

1. Particularity and Time
2. The Republic and its Fortune
3. Value and History in the Prerevolutionary Atlantic
