= The Foundations of Modern Political Thought =

1978 book by Quentin Skinner

- First edition, volume 1
- Author: Quentin Skinner
- Language: English
- Subject: History of political thought
- Published: 1978
- Publisher: Cambridge University Press
- Publication place: United Kingdom
- Awards: Wolfson Prize for History (1979)
- ISBN: 978-0521293372 (Vol. 1); 978-0521294355 (Vol. 2)

The Foundations of Modern Political Thought is a two-volume work of intellectual history by Quentin Skinner, published in 1978. The work traces the conceptual origins of modern politics by investigating the history of political thought in the West at the turn of the medieval and early modern periods, from the 13th to the 16th centuries. It represents the contextualist approach to the history of ideas which Skinner and his colleagues in the Cambridge School had pioneered in the 1960s.

The Times Literary Supplement named the Foundations one of the 100 most influential books since World War II. An edited collection discussing and critiquing the work, Rethinking the Foundations of Modern Political Thought, was published in 2006.

== John G. A. Pocock's Assessment ==
Skinner's Foundations were discussed at a panel at the 95th annual meeting of the American Historical Association in 1980, chaired by Ralph E. Giesey, with J. H. M. Salmon, J. G. A. Pocock and Julian Franklin participating, Skinner commenting. The manuscript of Pocock's lecture is now part of the J. G. A. Pocock Collection at the Institute of Intellectual History for the University of St Andrews. It is an earlier and shorter version of his article Virtues, Rights, and Manners: A Model for Historians of Political Thought, published in 1981.

Pocock praises the Foundations for presenting "the continuity of Reformation with scholastic thought" and connects the book's themes with his own theses about the influence of Machiavellian thought not only to American ideology, but on Scottish Enlightenment as well. Based on Skinner's work, he distinguishes between "two themes or lines in argument in favour of civic liberty". While the humanist (Greek) one argues from a moral viewpoint, i.e. that liberty is required for virtus and justice is "the best life for man", the juristic-imperial (Roman) line uses liberty as a concept to describe the result of power (imperium) going back from a princeps to the people. The former is focused on positive liberty, the latter on negative liberty, exemplified by Pocock with the last words of Charles I that having liberty does not include participation in government. The hypothesis Pocock presents is, in essence, that liberalism – based on law, especially property rights (which Pocock characterizes "to the jurist" as "the essential object of right") – is unrelated to virtus, i.e. grounded not in the humanist, but the juristic-imperial strain of arguing for civic liberty. This "possessive individualism", according to Pocock, "defines the individual by his engagement in property transactions"; it is furthermore "long predating early modern capitalism".

Virtue is also a central topic in Pocock's later work about what he calls the conservative enlightenment.
