= J. G. A. Pocock =

New Zealand historian (1924–2023)

J. G. A. Pocock ONZM
- Born: John Greville Agard Pocock; 7 March 1924; London, England
- Died: 12 December 2023 (aged 99); Baltimore, Maryland, US
- Spouse: Felicity Willis-Fleming (m. 1958; died 2014)
- Children: 2

Academic background
- Education: Canterbury College (BA, MA); University of Cambridge (PhD)
- Doctoral advisor: Sir Herbert Butterfield

Academic work
- Discipline: History
- School or tradition: Cambridge School
- Institutions: University of Canterbury; St John's College, Cambridge; University of Otago; Washington University in St. Louis; Johns Hopkins University
- Notable works: The Machiavellian Moment (1975); Barbarism and Religion (1999–2015)

John Greville Agard Pocock ONZM (/ˈpoʊkɒk/; 7 March 1924 – 12 December 2023) was a New Zealand historian of political thought. He was especially known for his studies of republicanism in the early modern period (mostly in Europe, Britain, and America), his work on the history of English common law, his treatment of Edward Gibbon and other Enlightenment historians, and, in historical method, for his contributions to the history of political discourse.

Born in England, Pocock spent most of his early life in New Zealand. He moved to the United States in 1966. He taught at Washington University in St. Louis and from 1975 to 2011 at Johns Hopkins University in Baltimore. He was a member of both the American Academy of Arts and Sciences and the American Philosophical Society.

== Early life and career ==
Pocock was born in London on 7 March 1924, but in 1927 moved with his family to New Zealand where his father, Greville Pocock, was appointed professor of Classics at Canterbury College. He received bachelor's and master's degrees from Canterbury College before returning to England to study at the University of Cambridge, earning his PhD in 1952 under the tutelage of Herbert Butterfield. He returned to New Zealand to teach at Canterbury University College from 1946 to 1948, and to lecture at the University of Otago from 1953 to 1955. From 1955 to 1958, he was a Fellow of St John's College, Cambridge. In 1959, he established and chaired the Department of Political Science at the University of Canterbury. He moved to the US in 1966, where he became the William Eliot Smith professor of history at Washington University in St. Louis, Missouri. In 1974, Pocock moved to Johns Hopkins University in Baltimore, Maryland, where he taught until 2011.

His first book, entitled The Ancient Constitution and the Feudal Law examined the workings and origins of common law mind, showing how thinkers such as the English jurist Edward Coke (1552–1634) built up a historical analysis of British history into an epistemology of law and politics; and how that edifice later came to be subverted by scholars of the middle to late seventeenth century. Some of this work has since been revised.

== Later work ==
By the 1970s, Pocock had changed his focus from how lawyers understood the evolution of law to how philosophers and theologians did. The Machiavellian Moment (1975), a widely acclaimed volume, showed how Florentines, Englishmen, and Americans had responded to and analysed the destruction of their states and political orders in a succession of crises sweeping through the early modern world. Again, not all historians accept Pocock's account, but leading scholars of early modern republicanism show its influence – especially in their characterisation of political theorist James Harrington (1611–1677) as a salient historical actor.

Subsequent research by Pocock explored the literary world inhabited by the British historian Edward Gibbon (1737–1794), and how Gibbon understood the cataclysm of decline and fall within the Roman Empire as an inevitable conflict between ancient virtue and modern commerce. Gibbon, it turns out, evinces all the hallmarks of a bona fide civic humanist, even while composing his great "enlightened narrative". The first two volumes of Pocock's six-volume magnum opus on Gibbon, Barbarism and Religion, won the American Philosophical Society's Jacques Barzun Prize in Cultural History for the year 1999.

== The Cambridge School ==
Pocock is celebrated not merely as an historian, but as a pioneer of a new type of historical methodology: contextualism, i.e., the study of "texts in context". In the 1960s and early '70s, he, (introducing "languages" of political thought) along with Quentin Skinner (focusing on authorial intention), and John Dunn (stressing biography), united informally to undertake this approach as the "Cambridge School" of the history of political thought. Hereafter for the Cambridge School and its adherents, the then-reigning method of textual study, that of engaging a vaunted 'canon' of previously pronounced "major" political works in a typically anachronistic and disjointed fashion, simply would not do.

Pocock's "political languages" is the indispensable keystone of this historical revision. Defined as "idioms, rhetorics, specialised vocabularies and grammars" considered as "a single though multiplex community of discourse", languages are uncovered (or discovered) in texts by historians who subsequently "learn" them in due course. The resultant familiarity produces a knowledge of how political thought can be stated in historically discovered "linguistic universes", and in exactly what manner all or parts of a text can be expressed. As examples, Pocock has cited the seventeenth- and eighteenth-century political languages of the "common law", "civil jurisprudence" and "classical republicanism", through which political writers such as James Harrington, Thomas Hobbes and John Locke reached their rhetorical goals.

In a new article in January 2019, Pocock answered parts of the criticism against the contextualism of the "Cambridge School": "The beginnings of the ‘global’ critique are well known and may as well be accepted as common ground. They reduce to the assertion that ‘Cambridge’ scholarship in this field is ‘Eurocentric’ [...] This is obviously true, and calls for reformation."

== British history ==
From 1975, Pocock began advocating the development of a new subject which he called "British History" (also labelled "New British History", a title that Pocock expressed his wish to shake off). Pocock coined the term Atlantic archipelago as a replacement for British Isles: "We should start with what I have called the Atlantic archipelago – since the term "British Isles" is one which Irishmen reject and Englishmen decline to take quite seriously".

He also pressed his fellow historians to reconsider two issues linked to the future of British history. First, he urged historians of the British Isles to move away from histories of the Three Kingdoms (Scotland, Ireland, England) as separate entities, and he called for studies implementing a bringing-together or conflation of the national narratives into truly integrated enterprises. It has since become the commonplace preference of historians to treat British history in just that fashion.

Second, he prodded policymakers to reconsider the Europeanisation of the UK still underway, via its entry into the European Union. In its abandonment of a major portion of national sovereignty purely from economic motives, that decision threw into question the entire matter of British sovereignty itself. What, Pocock asks, will (and must) nations look like if the capacity for and exercise of national self-determination is put up for sale to the highest bidder?

=== Nationalism ===
In brief reflections on nationalism manifest in the history of Greater Britain and the wider Atlantic World, Pocock frequently distinguished between "national republicanism" and "republican nationalism", tracing shifts within this polarity across Ireland, Scotland, and England. Change through linear time generated what he described as "settler nationalism." For instance, in 2000, Pocock contended that "the history of the Irish response to the [late eighteenth-century] imperial crisis, the American Revolution and later the French, culminates with the United Irishmen's attempt to put together a national republicanism which, after its failure and the imposition of the Union, became the foundation of a republican nationalism." The Society of United Irishmen closely followed the fate of the U.S. Confederation during the 1780s "critical period." The "Whiggish" Church of Ireland concurred with these United Irishmen that the Congress of the Confederation had been "ineffective." In reaction, both sought greater parliamentary autonomy, organizing a "national Protestant militia for the patriot purpose of demanding it; a programme natural to what we are calling settler nationalism." Church ascendancy in Irish political economy, however, both facilitated, and hampered, confederal status.

According to Pocock, in the history of Irish Protestant parishes, specters of a previously "hard-core" Reformed Christianity had either contributed to rebellions or spurred support for the state. Pocock pointed out that "to see this as key to the journey of Northern Protestants from rebellion towards loyalism is to say that they have a history of their own, unshared with others; but it has become the aim of republican nationalism to deny them such autonomy." Following the Acts of Union 1800, the parliamentary state "confronted, and helped engender by way of reaction against itself, a modern democratic nationalism (and, by way of reaction against the latter, a counter nationalist loyalism in the distinctive history of the North)."

He also included "Puritan religious nationalism and sectarianism" as well as the United States in the context of comparative "nationalist historiography." Pocock, however, emphasized the transmission of ideas on British sovereignty circulating in North America prior to 1763. These ideas were, in turn, replicated in U.S. federalism, sowing the seeds of U.S. "empire" rather than solely the "republican nationalism" found in the United Kingdom. These arguments aligned with the analysis of "creole pioneers" in the Age of Revolution posed by Benedict Anderson in Imagined Communities.

=== Conservative Enlightenment ===
In 1988, Pocock delivered the Government and Opposition/Leonard Schapiro Lecture at the London School of Economics, which was subsequently published under the title “Conservative Enlightenment and Democratic Revolutions: The American and French Cases in British Perspective”. He argues that (one strain of) Enlightenment also – among other effects – “strengthen[ed] existing elites—some of them clerical—in their capacity for civil control.” Especially pre-Enlightenment philosophers were “well aware” and “fully conscious” about the effects of their work, which resulted more in “the protection of sovereign authority and personal security against religious fanaticism and civil war” than “emancipation”. Those scholars, especially in England and Scotland, saw “disputes over the sovereign’s authority in matters spiritual” (e.g., in particular, about transubstantiation) as the cause for the civil war they had experienced (e.g. Thomas Hobbes). The uprising scepticism in the Age of Enlightenment should lead, in their opinions, to “self-limitation of the mind” and submission to authority, specifically in theological questions; directed, in fact, against both sects and the Roman Papacy. Pocock tied those thoughts to the American Revolution, seen from the viewpoint of conservative enlightenment “less a revolution than a war of secession”; not citizens of the same people fought – i.e., a civil war – over religious matters, but two (almost) independent states, although it resembled some specificities of wars of religion.

In addition, Pocock picked up again the role and matter of virtue in government, which he had already presented in a 1981 article in the aftermath of a discussion about Quentin Skinner’s The Foundations of Modern Political Thought. Individual virtue, for Pocock both the content and aim of a Greek-Athenian humanism, is in the antagonism between the American and British idea of government “remedy for corruption” found so widely in the latter’s parliamentary monarchy. The question “whether the individual’s need for a sense of moral self could be fulfilled by the establishment of a form of government in which he was morally involved” can also be traced back, in history (drafting of the U.S. Constitution) as well as in Pocock’s own works.

== New Zealand ==
Alongside his work on Gibbon came a renewed attention to his nation of citizenship, New Zealand. In a progression of essays published since 1991, Pocock explored the historical mandates and implications of the 1840 Treaty of Waitangi (between the British Crown and the indigenous Māori people) for Māori and the descendants of the original 19th-century European (but mainly British) settlers, known as Pākehā. Both parties have legitimate claims to portions of their national sovereignty.

Pocock concludes that the issue of New Zealand's sovereignty must be an ongoing shared experience, a perpetual debate leading to several ad hoc agreements if necessary, to which the Māori and Pākehā need to accustom themselves permanently. The alternative, an eventual rebirth of the violence and bloodshed of the 19th century New Zealand Wars, cannot and must not be entertained.

In the 2002 Queen's Birthday and Golden Jubilee Honours, Pocock was appointed an Officer of the New Zealand Order of Merit, for services to the history of political thought.

== Release of unpublished lectures and essays ==
In the months before his death in December 2023, Pocock authorized the digitization and Creative Commons release of previously unpublished writings from the John G. A. Pocock Papers at the Johns Hopkins Libraries. These essays became the fledgling and digital basis of the J. G. A. Pocock Collection at the Institute of Intellectual History for the University of St Andrews. Examples include an unpublished essay on Tom Bombadil in The Lord of the Rings, a lecture and critical assessment of The Foundations of Modern Political Thought for the American Historical Association and a lecture on comparisons between British and U.S. notions of "conservatism" in the eighteenth, nineteenth, and twentieth centuries.

== Personal life ==
In 1958, Pocock married Felicity Willis-Fleming; they had two sons and were married until her death in 2014.

Pocock died from heart failure at a care home in Baltimore on 12 December 2023, at the age of 99.

== Monographs ==
Pocock published the following monographs:

- The Ancient Constitution and the Feudal Law: a study of English Historical Thought in the Seventeenth Century. Cambridge: Cambridge University Press. 1957 – via Internet Archive., reprinted 1987.
- The Maori and New Zealand Politics (Hamilton, Blackwood & Janet Paul: 1965) editor, co-author
- Politics, Language and Time: Essays on Political Thought and History (Chicago: 1989, rept. 1972)
- Obligation and Authority in Two English Revolutions: the Dr. W. E. Collins lecture delivered at the University on 17 May 1973 (Victoria University: 1973)
- The Machiavellian Moment: Florentine Political Thought and the Atlantic Republican Tradition (Princeton: 1975, rept. 2003, 2016)
- The Political Works of James Harrington (1977; 2 vol. set, 2010)** editor
- John Locke : papers read at a Clark Library Seminar, 10 December 1977 (University of California: 1980) co-author
- Three British Revolutions: 1641, 1688, 1776 (Princeton: 1980) editor, co-author
- Virtue, Commerce and History: Essays on Political Thought and History Chiefly in the Eighteenth Century (1985)
- Edmund Burke: Reflections on the Revolution in France (Hackett: 1987) editor
- Conceptual Change and the Constitution (University Press of Kansas: 1988) co-editor, co-author
- James Harrington: The Commonwealth of Oceana and A System of Politics (1992) editor
- The Varieties of British Political Thought 1500–1800 (1993) co-editor, co-author
- Edward Gibbon: Bicentenary Essays (Voltaire Foundation: 1997) co-editor
- Barbarism and Religion, vol. 1: The Enlightenments of Edward Gibbon, 1737–1794 (1999)
- Barbarism and Religion, vol. 2: Narratives of Civil Government (1999)
- Barbarism and Religion, vol. 3: The First Decline and Fall (2003)
- Barbarism and Religion, vol. 4: Barbarians, Savages and Empires (2005)
- Barbarism and Religion, vol. 5: Religion: the First Triumph (2011)
- Barbarism and Religion, vol. 6: Barbarism: Triumph in the West (2015)
- The Discovery of Islands: Essays in British History (2005)
- Political Thought and History: Essays on Theory and Method (2009), Cambridge University Press.

In addition, as of January 2017 Pocock published more than 260 scholarly articles and reviews.
