= Two Treatises of Government =

1689 work by John Locke

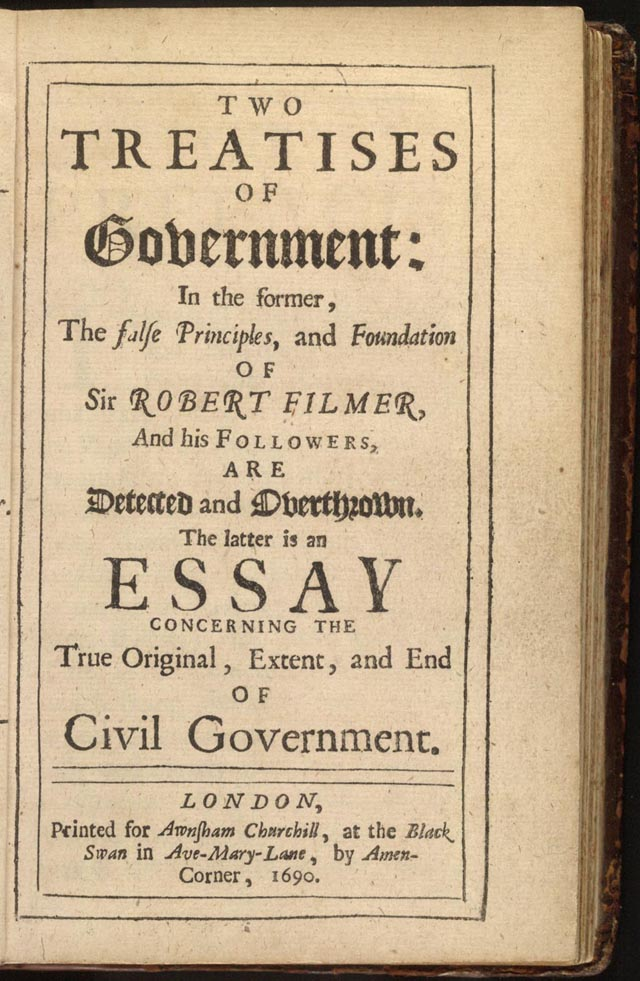
- Title page from the first edition
- Author: John Locke
- Language: English
- Series: None
- Subject: Political philosophy, Liberalism, Classical liberalism
- Publisher: Awnsham Churchill
- Publication date: December 1689 (dated 1690)
- Publication place: England
- Media type: Print
- Text: Two Treatises of Government at Wikisource

Two Treatises of Government (full title: Two Treatises of Government: In the Former, The False Principles, and Foundation of Sir Robert Filmer, and His Followers, Are Detected and Overthrown. The Latter Is an Essay Concerning The True Original, Extent, and End of Civil Government) is English philosopher John Locke's principal work of political philosophy. It was published anonymously in 1689, after the Glorious Revolution, but likely drafted 1680-81 during the Exclusion Crisis (1679–81). The First Treatise attacks patriarchalism in the form of sentence-by-sentence refutation of the late Robert Filmer's (c. 1588–1653) Patriarcha, which argues for a divinely ordained, hereditary, absolute monarchy, ideas which remained current with living defenders. The Second Treatise outlines Locke's ideas for a more civilized society based on natural rights and contract theory, with government requiring the consent of the governed, and, under limited circumstances, the right to overthrow the ruler. "There can be no doubt that the Second Treatise was, in its time and place, a revolutionary work." The book is a key foundational text in the theory of liberalism.

This publication contrasts with earlier political works by Locke himself. In Two Tracts on Government, written in 1660, Locke defends a conservative position; however, Locke never published this earlier work.

== Historical context ==
Historian Peter Laslett has shown that the bulk of the writing was completed between 1679 and 1680 during the Exclusion Crisis, and subsequently revised after Locke was driven into Dutch exile in 1683. The arguments in First Treatise make sense as a refutation of the divine right of kings. During the Exclusion Crisis, which attempted to prevent James, the Catholic-convert brother of Charles II from ever taking the throne, Lord Shaftesbury, Locke's mentor, patron, and the leader of the Whigs, introduced the Exclusion bill, which was not passed. However, it precipitated Charles II removing Shaftesbury as Lord Chancellor. Richard Ashcraft, following in Laslett's suggestion that the Two Treatises were written before the 1688 Revolution that ousted James II, objected that Shaftesbury's party did not advocate revolution during the Exclusion Crisis. He suggests that they are instead better associated with the revolutionary conspiracies that swirled around what would come to be known as the Rye House Plot. Shaftesbury and Locke and many others were forced into exile in the Netherlands; some, such as Algernon Sidney, were executed for treason in 1683. Locke and Sidney argued along similar lines. James II of England was overthrown in 1688 by a union of Parliamentarians and the Protestant stadtholder of the Dutch Republic William III of Oranje-Nassau (William of Orange). He ascended the English throne as William III of England, ruling jointly with Mary II, as Protestants. Mary was the daughter of James II, and had a strong claim to the English Throne, now known as the Glorious Revolution. Locke claims in the "Preface" to the Two Treatises that its purpose is to justify William III's ascension to the throne, but it is more likely the 1688 Glorious Revolution presented an opportunity to publish the existing manuscript, although anonymously. Locke knew his work was dangerous and did not acknowledge his authorship until the end of his life.

== Publication history ==
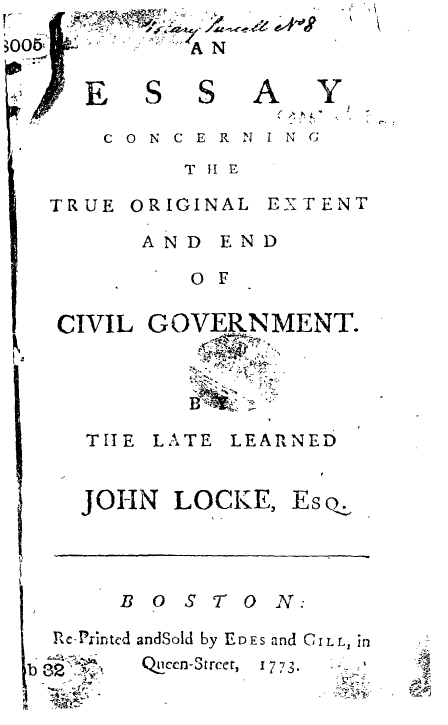
The only edition of the Treatises published in America during the 18th century (1773)

Two Treatises was first published, anonymously, in December 1689 (following printing conventions of the time, its title page was marked 1690). Locke was dissatisfied with the numerous errors and complained to the publisher. For the rest of his life, he was intent on republishing the Two Treatises in a form that better reflected its intended meaning, but he did not formally acknowledge it as his work until just before his death. Historian Peter Laslett, one of the foremost Locke scholars, has suggested that Locke held the printers to a higher "standard of perfection" than the technology of the time would permit. In any case, the first edition was replete with errors. The second edition was even worse, in addition to being printed on cheap paper. The third edition was much improved, but still deemed unsatisfactory by Locke. He corrected the third edition by hand and entrusted the publication of the fourth to his friends, as he died before it could be brought out.

Two Treatises is prefaced with Locke announcing what he aims to achieve, also mentioning that more than half of his original draft, occupying a space between the First and Second Treatises, has been irretrievably lost. Laslett maintains that, while Locke may have added or altered some portions in 1689, he did not make any revisions to accommodate for the missing section. The end of the First Treatise breaks off in mid-sentence.

In 1691 Two Treatises was translated into French by David Mazzel, a French Huguenot living in the Netherlands, following the revocation of the Edict of Nantes. This translation left out Locke's "Preface," all of the First Treatise, and the first chapter of the Second Treatise (which summarised Locke's conclusions in the First Treatise). It was in this form that Locke's work was reprinted during the 18th century in France and in this form that Montesquieu, Voltaire and Rousseau read it. The only American edition from the 18th century was printed in 1773 in Boston; it, too, left out all of these sections. There were no other American editions until the 20th century.

== Main ideas ==
Two Treatises is divided into the First Treatise and the Second Treatise, typically shortened to "Book I" and "Book II" respectively. Before publication, Locke gave it greater prominence by (hastily) inserting a separate title page: "An Essay Concerning the True Original, Extent and End of Civil Government". The First Treatise is focused on the refutation of Sir Robert Filmer, in particular his Patriarcha, which argued that civil society was founded on divinely sanctioned patriarchalism. Locke proceeds through Filmer's arguments, contesting his proofs from Scripture and ridiculing them as senseless, until concluding that no government can be justified by an appeal to the divine right of kings.

The Second Treatise outlines a theory of civil society. Locke begins by describing the state of nature, and appeals to God's creative intent in his case for human equality in this primordial context. From this, he goes on to explain the hypothetical rise of property and civilization, in the process explaining that the only legitimate governments are those that have the consent of the people. Therefore, any government that rules without the consent of the people can, in theory, be overthrown, i.e., revolutions can be just.

== First Treatise ==
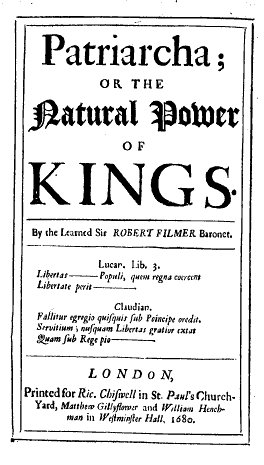
Title page from Filmer's Patriarcha (1680)

The First Treatise is an extended attack on Sir Robert Filmer's Patriarcha. Locke's argument proceeds along two lines: first, he undercuts the Scriptural support that Filmer had offered for his thesis, and second he argues that the acceptance of Filmer's thesis can lead only to slavery (and absurdity). Locke chose Filmer as his target, he says, because of his reputation and because he "carried this Argument [jure divino] farthest, and is supposed to have brought it to perfection" (1st Tr., § 5).

Filmer's text presented an argument for a divinely ordained, hereditary, absolute monarchy. According to Filmer, the Biblical Adam in his role as father possessed unlimited power over his children and this authority passed down through the generations. Locke attacks this on several grounds. Accepting that fatherhood grants authority, he argues, it would do so only by the act of begetting, and so cannot be transmitted to one's children because only God can create life. Nor is the power of a father over his children absolute, as Filmer would have it; Locke points to the joint power parents share over their children referred to in the Bible. In the Second Treatise Locke returns to a discussion of parental power. (Both of these discussions have drawn the interest of modern feminists such as Carole Pateman.)

Filmer also suggested that Adam's absolute authority came from his ownership over all the world. To this, Locke responds that the world was originally held in common (a theme that will return in the Second Treatise). But, even if it were not, he argues, God's grant to Adam covered only the land and brute animals, not human beings. Nor could Adam, or his heir, leverage this grant to enslave mankind, for the law of nature forbids reducing one's fellows to a state of desperation, if one possesses a sufficient surplus to maintain oneself securely. And even if this charity were not commanded by reason, Locke continues, such a strategy for gaining dominion would prove only that the foundation of government lies in consent.

Locke intimates in the First Treatise that the doctrine of divine right of kings (jure divino) will eventually be the downfall of all governments. In his final chapter he asks, "Who heir?" If Filmer is correct, there should be only one rightful king in all the world, the heir of Adam. But since it is impossible to discover the true heir of Adam, no government, under Filmer's principles, can require that its members obey its rulers. Filmer must therefore say that men are duty-bound to obey their present rulers. Locke writes:

I think he is the first Politician, who, pretending to settle Government upon its true Basis, and to establish the Thrones of lawful Princes, ever told the World, That he was properly a King, whose Manner of Government was by Supreme Power, by what Means soever he obtained it; which in plain English is to say, that Regal and Supreme Power is properly and truly his, who can by any Means seize upon it; and if this be, to be properly a King, I wonder how he came to think of, or where he will find, an Usurper. (1st Tr., § 79)

Locke ends the First Treatise by examining the history told in the Bible and the history of the world since then; he concludes that there is no evidence to support Filmer's hypothesis. According to Locke, no king has ever claimed that his authority rested upon his being the heir of Adam. It is Filmer, Locke contends, who is the innovator in politics, not those who assert the natural equality and freedom of man.

== Second Treatise ==
In the Second Treatise, Locke develops a number of notable themes. It begins with a depiction of the state of nature, wherein individuals are under no obligation to obey one another but are each themselves judge of what the law of nature requires. It also covers conquest and slavery, property, representative government, and the right of revolution.

=== State of Nature ===
Locke defines the state of nature thus:

To properly understand political power and trace its origins, we must consider the state that all people are in naturally. That is a state of perfect freedom of acting and disposing of their own possessions and persons as they think fit within the bounds of the law of nature. People in this state do not have to ask permission to act or depend on the will of others to arrange matters on their behalf. The natural state is also one of equality in which all power and jurisdiction is reciprocal and no one has more than another. It is evident that all human beings—as creatures belonging to the same species and rank and born indiscriminately with all the same natural advantages and faculties—are equal amongst themselves. They have no relationship of subordination or subjection unless God (the lord and master of them all) had clearly set one person above another and conferred on him an undoubted right to dominion and sovereignty.

In 17th-century England, the work of Thomas Hobbes popularized theories based upon a state of nature, even as most of those who employed such arguments were deeply troubled by his absolutist conclusions. Locke's state of nature can be seen in light of this tradition. There is not and never has been any divinely ordained monarch over the entire world, Locke argues. However, the fact that the natural state of humanity is without an institutionalized government does not mean it is lawless. Human beings are still subject to the laws of God and nature. In contrast to Hobbes, who posited the state of nature as a hypothetical possibility, Locke takes great pains to show that such a state did indeed exist. Actually, it still exists in the area of international relations where there is not and is never likely to be any legitimate overarching government (i.e., one directly chosen by all the people subject to it). Whereas Hobbes stresses the disadvantages of the state of nature, Locke points to its good points. It is free, if full of continual dangers (2nd Tr., § 123). Finally, the proper alternative to the natural state is not political dictatorship/tyranny but a government that has been established with consent of the people and the effective protection of basic human rights to life, liberty, and property under the rule of law.

Nobody in the natural state has the political power to tell others what to do. However, everybody has the right to authoritatively pronounce justice and administer punishment for breaches of the natural law. Thus, men are not free to do whatever they please. "The state of nature has a law of nature to govern it, which obliges every one: and reason, which is that law, teaches all mankind, who will but consult it, that... no one ought to harm another in his life, health, liberty, or possessions" (2nd Tr., § 6). The specifics of this law are unwritten, however, and so each is likely to misapply it in his own case. Lacking any commonly recognised, impartial judge, there is no way to correct these misapplications or to effectively restrain those who violate the law of nature.

The law of nature is therefore ill enforced in the state of nature.

IF man in the state of nature be so free, as has been said; if he be absolute lord of his own person and possessions, equal to the greatest, and subject to no body, why will he part with his freedom? Why will he give up this empire, and subject himself to the dominion and control of any other power? To which it is obvious to answer, that though in the state of nature he hath such a right, yet the enjoyment of it is very uncertain, and constantly exposed to the invasion of others: for all being kings as much as he, every man his equal, and the greater part no strict observers of equity and justice, the enjoyment of the property he has in this state is very unsafe, very unsecure. This makes him willing to quit a condition, which, however free, is full of fears and continual dangers: and it is not without reason, that he seeks out, and is willing to join in society with others, who are already united, or have a mind to unite, for the mutual preservation of their lives, liberties and estates, which I call by the general name, property. (2nd Tr., § 123)

It is to avoid the state of war that often occurs in the state of nature, and to protect their private property that men enter into civil or political society, i.e., state of society.

=== Conquest and slavery ===
Ch. 4 ("Of Slavery") and Ch. 16 ("Of Conquest") are sources of some confusion: the former provides a justification for slavery that can nonetheless never be met, and thus constitutes an argument against the institution; the latter concerns the rights of conquerors, which Locke seeks to challenge.

In the rhetoric of 17th-century England, those who opposed the increasing power of the kings claimed that the country was headed for a condition of slavery. Locke therefore asks, facetiously, under what conditions such slavery might be justified. He notes that slavery cannot come about as a matter of contract (which became the basis of Locke's political system). To be a slave is to be subject to the absolute, arbitrary power of another; as men do not have this power even over themselves, they cannot sell or otherwise grant it to another. One that is deserving of death, i.e., who has violated the law of nature, may be enslaved. This is, however, but the state of war continued (2nd Tr., § 24), and even one justly a slave therefore has no obligation to obedience.

In providing a justification for slavery, he has rendered all forms of slavery as it actually exists invalid. Moreover, as one may not submit to slavery, there is a moral injunction to attempt to throw off and escape it whenever it looms. Most scholars take this to be Locke's point regarding slavery: submission to absolute monarchy is a violation of the law of nature, for one does not have the right to enslave oneself.

The legitimacy of an English king depended on (somehow) demonstrating descent from William the Conqueror: the right of conquest was therefore a topic rife with constitutional connotations. Locke does not say that all subsequent English monarchs have been illegitimate, but he does make their rightful authority dependent solely upon their having acquired the people's approbation.

Locke first argues that, clearly, aggressors in an unjust war can claim no right of conquest: everything they despoil may be retaken as soon as the dispossessed have the strength to do so. Their children retain this right, so an ancient usurpation does not become lawful with time. The rest of the chapter then considers what rights a just conqueror might have.

The argument proceeds negatively: Locke proposes one power a conqueror could gain, and then demonstrates how in point of fact that power cannot be claimed. He gains no authority over those that conquered with him, for they did not wage war unjustly: thus, whatever other right William may have had in England, he could not claim kingship over his fellow Normans by right of conquest. The subdued are under the conqueror's despotical authority, but only those who actually took part in the fighting. Those who were governed by the defeated aggressor do not become subject to the authority of the victorious aggressor. They lacked the power to do an unjust thing, and so could not have granted that power to their governors: the aggressor therefore was not acting as their representative, and they cannot be punished for his actions. And while the conqueror may seize the person of the vanquished aggressor in an unjust war, he cannot seize the latter's property: he may not drive the innocent wife and children of a villain into poverty for another's unjust acts. While the property is technically that of the defeated, his innocent dependents have a claim that the just conqueror must honour. He cannot seize more than the vanquished could forfeit, and the latter had no right to ruin his dependents. (He may, however, demand and take reparations for the damages suffered in the war, so long as these leave enough in the possession of the aggressor's dependants for their survival).

In so arguing, Locke accomplishes two objectives. First, he neutralises the claims of those who see all authority flowing from William I by the latter's right of conquest. In the absence of any other claims to authority (e.g., Filmer's primogeniture from Adam, divine anointment, etc.), all kings would have to found their authority on the consent of the governed. Second, he removes much of the incentive for conquest in the first place, for even in a just war the spoils are limited to the persons of the defeated and reparations sufficient only to cover the costs of the war, and even then only when the aggressor's territory can easily sustain such costs (i.e., it can never be a profitable endeavour). Needless to say, the bare claim that one's spoils are the just compensation for a just war does not suffice to make it so, in Locke's view.

=== Property ===
In the Second Treatise, Locke claims that civil society was created for the protection of property. In saying this, he relies on the etymological root of "property," Latin proprius, or what is one's own, including oneself (cf. French propre). Thus, by "property" he means "life, liberty, and estate." In A Letter Concerning Toleration, he wrote that the magistrate's power was limited to preserving a person's "civil interest", which he described as "life, liberty, health, and indolency of body; and the possession of outward things". By saying that political society was established for the better protection of property, he claims that it serves the private (and non-political) interests of its constituent members: it does not promote some good that can be realised only in community with others (e.g. virtue).

For this account to work, individuals must possess some property outside of society, i.e., in the state of nature: the state cannot be the sole origin of property, declaring what belongs to whom. If the purpose of government is the protection of property, the latter must exist independently of the former. Filmer had said that, if there even were a state of nature (which he denied), everything would be held in common: there could be no private property, and hence no justice or injustice (injustice being understood as treating someone else's goods, liberty, or life as if it were one's own). Thomas Hobbes had argued the same thing. Locke therefore provides an account of how material property could arise in the absence of government.

He begins by asserting that each individual, at a minimum, "owns" himself, although, properly speaking, God created man and we are God's property; this is a corollary of each individual's being free and equal in the state of nature. As a result, each must also own his own labour: to deny him his labour would be to make him a slave. One can therefore take items from the common store of goods by mixing one's labour with them: an apple on the tree is of no use to anyone—it must be picked to be eaten—and the picking of that apple makes it one's own. In an alternate argument, Locke claims that we must allow it to become private property lest all mankind have starved, despite the bounty of the world. A man must be allowed to eat, and thus have what he has eaten be his own (such that he could deny others a right to use it). The apple is surely his when he swallows it, when he chews it, when he bites into it, when he brings it to his mouth, etc.: it became his as soon as he mixed his labour with it (by picking it from the tree).

This does not yet say why an individual is allowed to take from the common store of nature. There is a necessity to do so to eat, but this does not yet establish why others must respect one's property, especially as they labour under the like necessity. Locke assures his readers that the state of nature is a state of plenty: one may take from communal store if one leaves a) enough and b) as good for others, and since nature is bountiful, one can take all that one can use without taking anything from someone else. Moreover, one can take only so much as one can use before it spoils. There are then two provisos regarding what one can take, the "enough and as good" condition and "spoilage."

Gold does not rot. Neither does silver, or any other precious metal or gem. They are, moreover, useless, their aesthetic value not entering into the equation. One can heap up as much of them as one wishes, or take them in trade for food. By the tacit consent of mankind, they become a form of money (one accepts gold in exchange for apples with the understanding that someone else will accept that gold in exchange for wheat). One can therefore avoid the spoilage limitation by selling all that one has amassed before it rots; the limits on acquisition thus disappear.

In this way, Locke argues that a full economic system could, in principle, exist within the state of nature. Property could therefore predate the existence of government, and thus society can be dedicated to the protection of property.

=== Representative government ===
Locke did not demand a republic; he had lived through the chaos of the 1650s following the 1649 execution of the king and prior to the restoration of the monarchy in 1660. Rather, Locke thought that a legitimate contract could easily exist between citizens and a monarchy, an oligarchy or some mixed form (2nd Tr., sec. 132). Locke uses the term Common-wealth to mean "not a democracy, or any form of government, but any independent community" (sec. 133) and "whatever form the Common-wealth is under, the Ruling Power ought to govern by declared and received laws, and not by extemporary dictates and undetermined resolutions." (sec 137)

Locke does make a distinction between an executive (e.g., a monarchy), a "Power always in being" (sec 144) that must perpetually execute the law, and the legislative that is the "supreme power of the Common-wealth" (sec 134) and does not have to be always in being. (sec 153) Governments are charged by the consent of the individual, "i.e. the consent of the majority, giving it either by themselves, or their representatives chosen by them." (sec 140)

His notions of the people's rights and the role of civil government provided strong support for the intellectual movements of both the American Revolution and the French Revolution.

=== Right of revolution ===
The concept of the right of revolution was also taken up by John Locke in Two Treatises of Government as part of his social contract theory. Locke declared that under natural law, all people have the right to life, liberty, and estate; under the social contract, the people could instigate a revolution against the government when it acted against the interests of citizens, to replace the government with one that served the interests of citizens. In some cases, Locke deemed revolution an obligation. The right of revolution thus essentially acted as a safeguard against tyranny.

Locke affirmed an explicit right to revolution in Two Treatises of Government:

whenever the Legislators endeavor to take away, and destroy the Property of the People, or to reduce them to Slavery under Arbitrary Power, they put themselves into a state of War with the People, who are thereupon absolved from any farther Obedience, and are left to the common Refuge, which God hath provided for all Men, against Force and Violence. Whensoever therefore the Legislative shall transgress this fundamental Rule of Society; and either by Ambition, Fear, Folly or Corruption, endeavor to grasp themselves, or put into the hands of any other an Absolute Power over the Lives, Liberties, and Estates of the People; By this breach of Trust they forfeit the Power, the People had put into their hands, for quite contrary ends, and it devolves to the People, who have a Right to resume their original Liberty.

— sec. 222

== Reception and influence ==
=== Britain ===
Although the Two Treatises would become well known in the second half of the 18th century, they were somewhat neglected when initially published. Between 1689 and 1694, around 200 tracts and treatises were published concerning the legitimacy of the Glorious Revolution. Three of these mention Locke, two of which were written by friends of his. When Hobbes published the Leviathan in 1651, during the turmoil of the Interregnum with the execution of Charles I and the abolition of the monarchy, by contrast, dozens of texts were immediately written in response to it. As Mark Goldie explains: "Leviathan was a monolithic and unavoidable presence for political writers in Restoration England in a way that in the first half of the eighteenth the Two Treatises was not."

While the Two Treatises were not widely read until the 1760s, ideas from them did start to become important earlier in the century. According to Goldie, "the crucial moment was 1701" and "the occasion was the Kentish petition." The pamphlet war that ensued was one of the first times Locke's ideas were invoked in a public debate, most notably by Daniel Defoe. Locke's ideas did not go unchallenged and the periodical The Rehearsal, for example, launched a "sustained and sophisticated assault" against the Two Treatises and endorsed the ideology of patriarchalism. Not only did patriarchalism continue to be a legitimate political theory in the 18th century, but as J. G. A. Pocock and others have gone to great lengths to demonstrate, so was civic humanism and classical republicanism. Pocock has argued that Locke's Two Treatises had very little effect on British political theory; he maintains that there was no contractarian revolution. Rather, he contends these other long-standing traditions as far more important for 18th-century British politics.

In the middle of the 18th century, Locke's position as a political philosopher suddenly rose in prominence. For example, he was invoked by those arguing on behalf of the American colonies during the Stamp Act debates of 1765–66. Marginalized groups such as women, Dissenters and those campaigning to abolish the slave trade all invoked Lockean ideals. But at the same time, as Goldie describes it, "a wind of doubt about Locke's credentials gathered into a storm. The sense that Locke's philosophy had been misappropriated increasingly turned to a conviction that it was erroneous". By the 1790s Locke was associated with Rousseau and Voltaire and being blamed for the American and French Revolutions as well as for the perceived secularisation of society. By 1815, Locke's portrait was taken down from Christ Church, his alma mater (it was later restored to a position of prominence, and currently hangs in the dining hall of the college).

In 19th century England, Locke's pamphlet was also influential on radical thinkers like Thomas Hodgskin, Lysander Spooner, and John Francis Bray who adapted his labor theory of value to the new capitalist conditions of the industrial revolution.

=== North America ===
Locke's influence during the American Revolutionary period is disputed. While it is easy to point to specific instances of Locke's Two Treatises being invoked, the extent of the acceptance of Locke's ideals and the role they played in the American Revolution are far from clear. The Two Treatises are echoed in phrases in the Declaration of Independence and writings by Samuel Adams that attempted to gain support for the rebellion. Of Locke's influence Thomas Jefferson wrote: "Bacon, Locke and Newton I consider them as the three greatest men that have ever lived, without any exception, and as having laid the foundation of those superstructures which have been raised in the Physical & Moral sciences". The colonists frequently cited Blackstone's Commentaries on the Laws of England, which synthesised Lockean political philosophy with the common law tradition. Louis Hartz, writing at the beginning of the 20th century, took it for granted that Locke was the political philosopher of the revolution.

This view was challenged by Bernard Bailyn and Gordon S. Wood, who argued that the revolution was not a struggle over property, taxation, and rights, but rather "a Machiavellian effort to preserve the young republic's 'virtue' from the corrupt and corrupting forces of English politics." Garry Wills, on the other hand, maintains that it was neither the Lockean tradition nor the classical republican tradition that drove the revolution, but instead Scottish moral philosophy, a political philosophy that based its conception of society on friendship, sensibility and the controlled passions. Thomas Pangle and Michael Zuckert have countered, demonstrating numerous elements in the thought of more influential founders that have a Lockean pedigree. They argue that there is no conflict between Lockean thought and classical Republicanism.

Locke's ideas have not been without criticism with Howard Zinn arguing that the treatise "ignored the existing inequalities in property. And how could people truly have equal rights, with stark differences in wealth"? and others taking issue with his Labour theory of property.

== Controversies regarding interpretation ==
Locke's political philosophy is often compared and contrasted with Thomas Hobbes’ Leviathan. The motivation in both cases is self-preservation with Hobbes arguing the need of an absolute monarch to prevent the war of "all against all" inherent in anarchy while Locke argues that the protection of life, liberty, and property can be achieved by a parliamentary process that protects, not violates, one's rights.

Leo Strauss and C. B. Macpherson stress the continuity of thought. In their view Locke and Hobbes describe an atomistic man largely driven by a hedonistic materialistic acquisitiveness. Strauss' Locke is little more than Hobbes in "sheep’s clothing". C. B. Macpherson argued in his Political Theory of Possessive Individualism that Locke sets the stage for unlimited acquisition and appropriation of property by the powerful creating gross inequality. Government is the protector of interests of capitalists while the "labouring class [are] not considered to have an interest".

Unlike Macpherson, James Tully finds no evidence that Locke specifically advocates capitalism. In his A Discourse on Property, Tully describes Locke's view of man as a social dependent, with Christian sensibilities, and a God-given duty to care for others. Property, in Tully's explanation of Locke, belong to the community as the public commons but becomes "private" so long as the property owner, or more correctly the "custodian", serves the community. Zuckert believes Tully is reading into Locke rights and duties that just aren't there. Huyler finds that Locke explicitly condemned government privileges for rich, contrary to Macpherson's pro-capitalism critique, but also rejected subsidies to aid the poor, in contrast to Tully's social justice apologetics.

The Cambridge School of political thought, led principally by Quentin Skinner, J. G. A. Pocock, Richard Ashcraft, and Peter Laslett, uses a historical methodology to situate Locke in the political context of his times. But they also restrict his importance to those times. Ashcraft's Locke takes the side of the burgeoning merchant class against the aristocracy. Neal Wood puts Locke on the side of the agrarian interests, not the manufacturing bourgeoisie.

Jerome Huyler and Michael P. Zuckert approach Locke in the broader context of his oeuvre and historical influence. Locke is situated within changing religious, philosophical, scientific, and political dimensions of 17th century England. Objecting to the use of the contemporary concept of economic man to describe Locke's view of human nature, Huyler emphases the "virtue of industriousness" of Locke's Protestant England. Productive work is man's earthly function or calling, ordained by God and required by self-preservation. The government's protection of property rights insures that the results of industry, i.e. "fruits of one’s labor", are secure. Locke's prohibition of ill-gotten gains, whether for well-connected gentry or the profligate, is not a lack of Locke's foresight to the problems in the latter stages of liberalism but an application of equal protection of the law to every individual.

Richard Pipes argues that Locke holds a labor theory of value that leads to the socialist critique that those not engaging in physical labor exploit wage earners. Huyler, relying on Locke's Essays on the Law of Nature shows that reason is the most fundamental virtue, underwrites all productive virtue, and leads to human flourishing or happiness in an Aristotelian sense.

== See also ==
- United Kingdom constitutional law
