= Patriarcha =

1680 book by Robert Filmer

Patriarcha, or The Natural Power of Kings
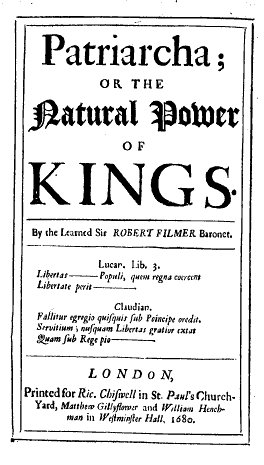
- Author: Robert Filmer
- Language: English
- Subject: Divine right of kings
- Published: 1680
- Media type: Print
- ISBN: 978-1409952374

Patriarcha, or The Natural Power of Kings is a book by the English philosopher Robert Filmer. It was likely begun in the 1620s and completed before the outbreak of the English Civil War in 1642 but it was only published in 1680 after the Restoration. The book defends the divine right of kings on the basis that all modern states' authority derived from the Biblical patriarchs (whom Filmer saw as Adam's heirs), history and logic. Concurrently, he criticized rival theories claiming the basis of a state should be the consent of the governed or social contract.

== Argument ==
The book describes an arrangement of patriarchy at every level of human society, and argues that this is natural. The state is like a family in which kings are like fathers with subjects who are like children.

== Reception ==
John Locke and others attacked what they saw as the absurdity of Filmer's views. The first of Locke's Two Treatises of Government consists mainly of criticism of Filmer. Locke found Filmer's account of political authority unworkable, arguing that it could not be used to justify any actual political authority, since it is impossible to show that any particular ruler is one of Adam's heirs.

Patriarcha remains Filmer's best known work. R. S. Downie considers Filmer's attacks on contract and consent as explanations of political obligation to be plausible, and finds it unfortunate that Filmer's belief in Adam's kingship has obscured them.
