= Locke's place-time-kind principle =

Principle in John Locke's metaphysics and theory of identity

Locke's place–time–kind principle, also called Locke's thesis, is a claim in the philosophy of John Locke that no two things of the same kind can occupy the same place at the same time, and that no single thing can be in two places at once. In contemporary discussions of Locke, the principle is often used to summarize and interpret the opening of his chapter "Of Identity and Diversity" in An Essay Concerning Human Understanding (1690).

In Locke's own presentation, the principle functions as part of his account of identity and individuation: when we ask whether something is "the same," we refer it to a determinate time and place of existence, where it excludes other things of the same kind. Locke also ties this thought to the idea of solidity (impenetrability), defining solidity as a body's resistance to the entrance of another body into the place it possesses.

There are some counterexamples to Locke's thesis in the philosophical literature.

== Role in Locke's philosophy ==
=== Formulation ===
Locke introduces the relevant claim at the start of Book II, Chapter 27 ("Of Identity and Diversity"), arguing that we neither find nor can conceive "two things of the same kind" existing in the same place at the same time, and that whatever exists "excludes all of the same kind" from that place at that time:

Another occasion the mind often takes of comparing, is the very being of things; when considering any thing as existing at any determined time and place, we compare it with itself existing at another time, and thereon form the ideas of identity and diversity. When we see any thing to be in any place in any instant of time, we are sure (be it what it will) that it is that very thing, and not another, which at that same time exists in another place, how like and undistinguishable soever it may be in all other respects: and in this consists identity, when the ideas it is attributed to vary not at all from what they were that moment wherein we consider their former existence, and to which we compare the present. For we never finding, nor conceiving it possible, that two things of the same kind should exist in the same place at the same time, we rightly conclude, that whatever exists any where at any time, excludes all of the same kind, and is there itself alone. When therefore we demand, whether any thing be the same or no; it refers always to something that existed such a time in such a place, which it was certain at that instant was the same with itself, and no other. From whence it follows, that one thing cannot have two beginnings of existence, nor two things one beginning; it being impossible for two things of the same kind to be or exist in the same instant, in the very same place, or one and the same thing in different places. That therefore that had one beginning, is the same thing; and that which had a different beginning in time and place from that, is not the same, but diverse. That which has made the difficulty about this relation, has been the little care and attention used in having precise notions of the things to which it is attributed.

Locke then gives a concrete illustration using bodies: if two bodies could be in the same place at the same time, the "two parcels of matter" would have to be one and the same, undermining the distinction between "one" and "more."

=== Solidity and impenetrability ===
In Book II, Chapter 4 ("Idea of Solidity"), Locke rejects the Cartesian identification of body with mere extension and argues that body must also be solid (impenetrable). He defines solidity by appeal to resistance: a body resists "the entrance of any other body into the place it possesses, till it has left it."

Commentators commonly read this account of solidity as grounding Locke's treatment of bodies as occupying space in a way that excludes other bodies from the same place, distinguishing bodies from empty space (the void).

=== Theory of identity ===
Locke presents the principle as part of his broader account of the principle of individuation (principium individuationis), which he associates with existence at a particular time and place. He maintains that questions of identity for substances depend on what sort of thing is under discussion (e.g., atoms, masses, living things, persons), but that the initial "place–time–kind" constraint sets a baseline for distinguishing one thing from another.

In scholarship on Locke's personal identity theory, the principle is often cited because it appears to constrain how many entities of a given kind may coincide. For example, debates about whether Lockean persons are substances or modes sometimes appeal to the principle to argue about whether two thinking substances (e.g., a soul and a person, if both counted as substances) could be "in the same place at the same time."

== Interpretations ==
Locke's opening claim has been interpreted in different ways, including as:

- a metaphysical thesis about impenetrability or exclusion (especially for bodies),
- an epistemological constraint on how we identify and re-identify things over time (tying identity judgments to locating a thing as "this one here now"),
- or a more general principle about sortals ("kinds") and individuation that may apply differently across categories (God, finite spirits, bodies).

A survey of interpretations in contemporary Locke scholarship discusses the principle under the label "place–time–kind principle" and explores how its scope and motivation affect disputes about the ontology of persons and the nature of Lockean identity conditions.

Gideon Yaffe connects the principle to Locke's account of existence over time and to Locke's treatment of "place" as relative to our purposes and to the kind under which we are classifying an entity.

Locke's exclusionary-sounding thesis is frequently compared to later debates about whether distinct material objects can be wholly located in the same region at the same time (for example, a statue and the lump of clay that constitutes it). Contemporary metaphysicians sometimes treat "two things can't be in the same place at the same time" as an intuitive objection to views that allow coincident objects, while defenders of coincidence argue that shared parts or other metaphysical distinctions can make sense of co-location.

== Counterexamples ==
Contemporary metaphysicians often formulate "Locke's thesis" as the claim that distinct material entities of the same (substantial) kind cannot be wholly co-located (i.e., cannot completely occupy the same region of space at the same time). A number of authors have argued that this principle has plausible counterexamples.

=== Fine (2000): coincident letters ===
Kit Fine proposes cases intended to show that there can be distinct, coincident entities of the same kind.

In one case, a man (Bruce) burns a breakup letter onto one side of a thick sheet of paper; his wife (Bertha) then burns a reply onto the other side, arranging the marks so as not to disturb the original marks. Fine argues that, despite being on different "sides," each letter is co-located with (and weighs as much as) the whole sheet, so the two letters coincide while remaining distinct.

In a second case, Fine imagines two fictional languages that share syntax but differ in meaning; a single inscription is intended as a letter in one language to one addressee and also as a letter in the other language to a different addressee, yielding (Fine claims) two distinct but coincident letters.

Some authors respond that these cases may trade on the polysemy of terms like "letter" (e.g., shifting between an abstract content and a concrete located item), and that once the relevant sense is fixed the alleged coincidence is less clear.

=== Spolaore (2012): conditional, interweaving counterexamples ===
Giuseppe Spolaore argues that if one accepts widely discussed "pluralist" arguments for the possibility of coincidence in general (for example, standard Wiggins-style cases), then one is strongly pressured to accept more direct counterexamples to Locke's thesis. His proposed cases involve an entity (Thin)—such as a yarn, rope, string, net, or carpet—being interwoven to produce what appears to be a distinct, thicker and shorter entity (Thick) of the same kind. If Thin persists through the interweaving process, and if Thick is a genuine object of that same kind, then (Spolaore argues) the result is a pair of distinct same-kind entities that wholly coincide.

Spolaore calls these counterexamples "conditional" because, on his presentation, they follow from commitments that many opponents of the stronger anti-coincidence principle already accept; rejecting them would require either denying the persistence claims used in familiar coincidence arguments, or sharply restricting which kinds count as "substantial" in a way that threatens the thesis's broader metaphysical interest.

== See also ==
- John Locke
- An Essay Concerning Human Understanding
- Impenetrability
- Mereology
