= Two Tracts on Government =

Philosophy articles by John Locke

Two Tracts on Government by John Locke is a work of political philosophy written from 1660 to 1662, in the early Restoration era following the collapse of the rule by Parliament and the Protectorate of the Interregnum. It remained unpublished until 1967, 263 years following the death of Locke in 1704.

It bears a similar name to a later, more famous, political philosophy work by Locke, Two Treatises of Government published in 1689/90. The two works, however, have very different positions. Unlike the Treatises, the Tracts support authoritarian policies in matters of religious worship, and it was largely written as a refutation to Edward Bagshaw's ideas advocating religious toleration. Later in life, Locke espoused liberal and anti-authoritarian views.

== Structure ==
Two Tracts on Government comprises two expositions. The first is in English, entitled Question: whether the Civil Magistrate may lawfully impose and determine the use of indifferent things in Religious Worship, to which Locke agrees. In it Locke attempts to refute Edward Bagshaw's The Great Question Concerning Things Indifferent in Religious Worship, published a year earlier advocating religious toleration. Locke argues that a magistrate, i.e., civil authority "is free to pass any law which, in his view, conduces to the civic good."

The second tract was written in Latin, entitled An Magistratus Civilis possit res adiaphoras in divini cultus rites asciscere, easque populo imponere? Afirmatur. It was written in 1662 and reaffirmed his view in the 1660 First Tract that civil authority could impose uniformity in established Anglicanism. Written in Latin rather than English, it would have a narrower readership. It "has the appearance of being a formal contribution to an academic debate." It was translated by Philip Abrams and published in 1967. Locke elaborates on the concepts of law and authority upon which the first tract is based.

== Historical background ==
Between 1642 and 1651 England was embroiled in the English Civil War between Charles I and his royalist supporters and Parliamentarians, who sought to check royal power. Conflict arose around religious tensions and questions of the King's right to rule. The Parliamentarians defeated the royalist army and captured the king.

Charles refused any check on his power, was tried by a special court and executed. The monarchy and House of Lords were abolished, and the English Commonwealth established. With the death of Oliver Cromwell the government subsequently collapsed and the Stuart monarchy was restored in 1660. Locke, growing up in such an atmosphere and influenced by earlier writers such as Thomas Hobbes, feared that liberty could lead to civil disturbance.

Tension between authoritarian and liberal views can be found already in this work, as seen by comparing it with Locke's later work in the Two Treatises of Government.

A few years later, Locke co-authored the Fundamental Constitutions of Carolina, which promise religious toleration, but establish aristocracy, slavery and serfdom. Locke himself became financially involved in slave trade during those years. Only later in his life did Locke come to endorse the liberalism he is known for.

== See also ==
- Fundamental Constitutions of Carolina
