= Richard Ashcraft =

American academic (1938–1995)

Richard Ashcraft (26 September 1938 – 1 November 1995) was an American political theorist and Professor of Political Science at UCLA. He graduated from Harvard College (BA) and University of California, Berkeley (PhD).

John Dunn claimed in 1986 that Ashcraft "has been one of the most effective and interesting analysts of Locke's social and political thought for nearly two decades" and that his Revolutionary Politics and Locke's Two Treatises of Government was "not only by far the most impressive political biography of Locke available but also the fullest study to date of "radical" politics in England between the late 1660s and 1689".

== Works ==
- Revolutionary Politics and Locke's Two Treatises of Government (Princeton University Press, 1986).
- Locke's "Two Treatises of Government" (Routledge, 1987).
- (editor), John Locke: Critical Assessments. Volume I (Routledge, 1991).
- ‘Latitudinarianism and toleration: historical myth versus political theory’, in Richard Kroll, Richard Ashcraft and Perez Zagorin (eds.), Philosophy, Science, and Religion in England 1640–1700 (Cambridge University Press, 1992), pp. 151–177.
