= Patriarchalism =

Political theory regarding absolute monarchy

Patriarchalism is an archetypal political conception that arose most succinctly in seventeenth century England. It defends absolute power for the monarchy, through language that emphasized the "paternal" power of the king over the state and his subjects.

Due to divisive religious policy, controversial political strategy at home and disastrous diplomatic campaigns abroad, James I and Charles I alienated the consensus of the people. Hence the patriots played down the leading role of the sovereign. They questioned the royal prerogative, seeing the king as the mere figurehead of England. The king's absolute authority was challenged by the authority of Parliament.

Against this increasing opposition, the Patriarchalists emphasized the absolute right of the king, as the paternal head of state. In Patriarcha (composed in the late 1620s), Sir Robert Filmer said "many out of an imaginary fear pretend the power of the people to be necessary for the repressing of the insolencies of tyrants, herein they propound a remedy far worse than the disease".

Filmer used genealogy as a way to legitimize kingship, by tracing the throne's origins back to the original fatherly rule of Adam.

Filmer argued that the king is the father; the relationship is not one of similarity, but of identity, the right of fathers having been passed down genealogically since Adam.

Similarly, stating that the ideal relationship was between a father and his son to indicate the "mutuall trust and Confidence" which was always necessary in the state, F.A. Kynaston put forward the view that the inferior (the people) ought not to plot against the superior (the king).

Richard Mocket maintained that the maxim “Honor thy Father, and thy Mother” pertained to the political sphere rather than to the familial one since it had more to do with political obedience than with submission within the household.

Locke and Montesquieu were instrumental in the popular rejection of Patriarchalism.
