= John Locke =

English philosopher and physician (1632–1704)

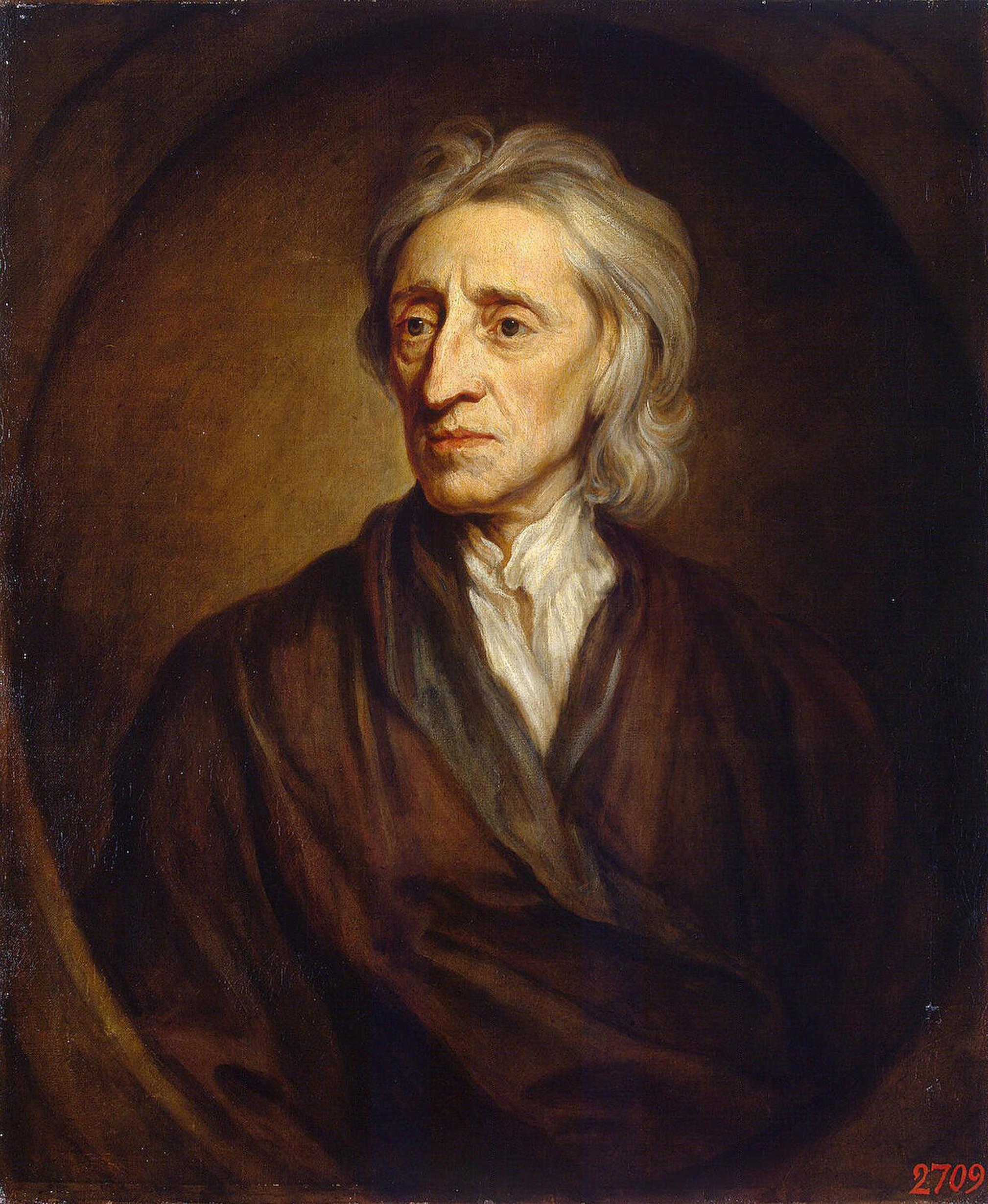
- Portrait by Sir Godfrey Kneller, 1697

Commissioner for Trade and Plantations
- In office 15 May 1696 – 28 June 1700
- Appointed by: William III
- Preceded by: Position established
- Succeeded by: Matthew Prior

Secretary and Treasurer to the Council for Trade and Foreign Plantations
- In office 14 October 1673 – 21 December 1674
- Appointed by: Anthony Ashley Cooper
- Preceded by: Benjamin Worsley
- Succeeded by: Position abolished

Secretary to the Lords Proprietors of Carolina
- In office 1668–1671
- Appointed by: Anthony Ashley Cooper
- Preceded by: Position established
- Succeeded by: Position abolished

Personal details
- Born: 29 August 1632 Wrington, Somerset, England
- Died: 28 October 1704 (aged 72) High Laver, Essex, England
- Party: Whig
- Education: Christ Church, Oxford (BA, 1656; MA, 1658; MB, 1675)

Philosophical work
- Era: Age of Enlightenment
- Region: Western philosophy
- School: Empiricism; Social contract; Natural law; Liberalism; Classical liberalism; Foundationalism; Conceptualism; Indirect realism; Correspondence theory of truth; Ideational theory of meaning; Corpuscularianism
- Institutions: Westminster School; University of Oxford; Royal Society
- Main interests: Metaphysics, epistemology, political philosophy, philosophy of mind, philosophy of education, economics
- Notable ideas: List: Consciousness; Consent of the governed; Inverted spectrum; Labor theory of property; Law of opinion; Locke's place-time-kind principle; Molyneux's problem; Argument from ignorance; Natural rights (rights of life, liberty and property); Primary/secondary quality distinction; Semeiotike (the doctrine of signs); Social contract; Sortal; State of nature; Tabula rasa

John Locke (/lɒk/; 29 August 1632 – 28 October 1704) was an English philosopher and physician, widely regarded as one of the most influential of the Enlightenment thinkers and commonly known as the "father of liberalism". His important works include A Letter Concerning Toleration (1689), Two Treatises of Government (1689/90), both published anonymously, and An Essay Concerning Human Understanding (1689/90). His writing on toleration contends that religion is a matter for the individual and that the churches are voluntary associations, ruling out religious coercion and uniformity. The ideas on the separation of church and state originated with Sir Harry Vane in Vane's two pamphlets "Zeal Examined" in 1651 and "A Healing Question" published in 1656. His Two Treatises on Government argues for government based on the consent of the governed and the right to revolt against tyrannous government which has lost consent. The Two Treatises are believed to have influenced the language that Thomas Jefferson chose in his drafting the July 1776 Declaration of Independence during the American War of Independence.

Locke lived through the tumultuous political era of the English Civil War and Commonwealth of England after the execution of Charles I, Restoration of the Stuart monarchy, and the 1688 Glorious Revolution. These experiences affected his political thinking and life choices. During the Interregnum, Locke won a place at Christ Church, Oxford after attending the prestigious Westminster School. He spent 15 years at Oxford, first as a student, then as a tutor, pursuing medical and other scientific interests in a circle of friends. He is also listed as a shareholder with the "Royal Company of Adventures Trading to Africa" founded by the Duke of York and King Charles II who traded in slaves beginning in 1663 per the charter of the company. In 1666, Locke became an associate of Lord Shaftesbury, a key figure in English political life after the Restoration (1660), and Locke was appointed to governmental posts at Shaftesbury's recommendation. Locke was elected a Fellow of the Royal Society (1668). When Shaftesbury fell from royal favour and died shortly thereafter, Locke went into political exile for five years in the Netherlands (1683–89). There he wrote some of his most important works. During this period, he gained the patronage of Thomas Herbert, 8th Earl of Pembroke. Locke returned to England from exile, accompanying Queen Mary II in 1689. He published three of his most notable works soon after his return. He served as a Commissioner of Trade and Plantations, then retired from public life due to ill health. For the last fourteen years of his life, he lived in the household of Sir Francis Masham and his wife, philosopher Lady Masham, whom Locke had known since she was a young woman.

Considered one of the first of the British empiricists, following the tradition of Francis Bacon, Locke is equally important to social contract theory. His work greatly affected the development of epistemology and political philosophy. His writings influenced Voltaire, Jean-Jacques Rousseau, and many Scottish Enlightenment thinkers, as well as the American Revolutionaries. His contributions to classical republicanism and liberal theory are reflected in the United States Declaration of Independence. Internationally, Locke's political-legal principles continue to have a profound influence on the theory and practice of limited representative government and the protection of basic rights and freedoms under the rule of law.

Locke's philosophy of mind is often cited as the origin of modern conceptions of personal identity and the psychology of self, figuring prominently in the work of later philosophers, such as Rousseau, David Hume, and Immanuel Kant. He postulated that, at birth, the mind is a blank slate, or tabula rasa. Contrary to Cartesian philosophy based on preexisting concepts, he maintained that we are born without innate ideas, and that knowledge is instead determined only by experience derived from sense perception, a concept now known as empiricism. Locke is often credited for describing private property as a natural right, arguing that when a person—metaphorically—mixes their labour with nature, resources can be removed from the common state of nature.

== Ancestry, early life, and education ==
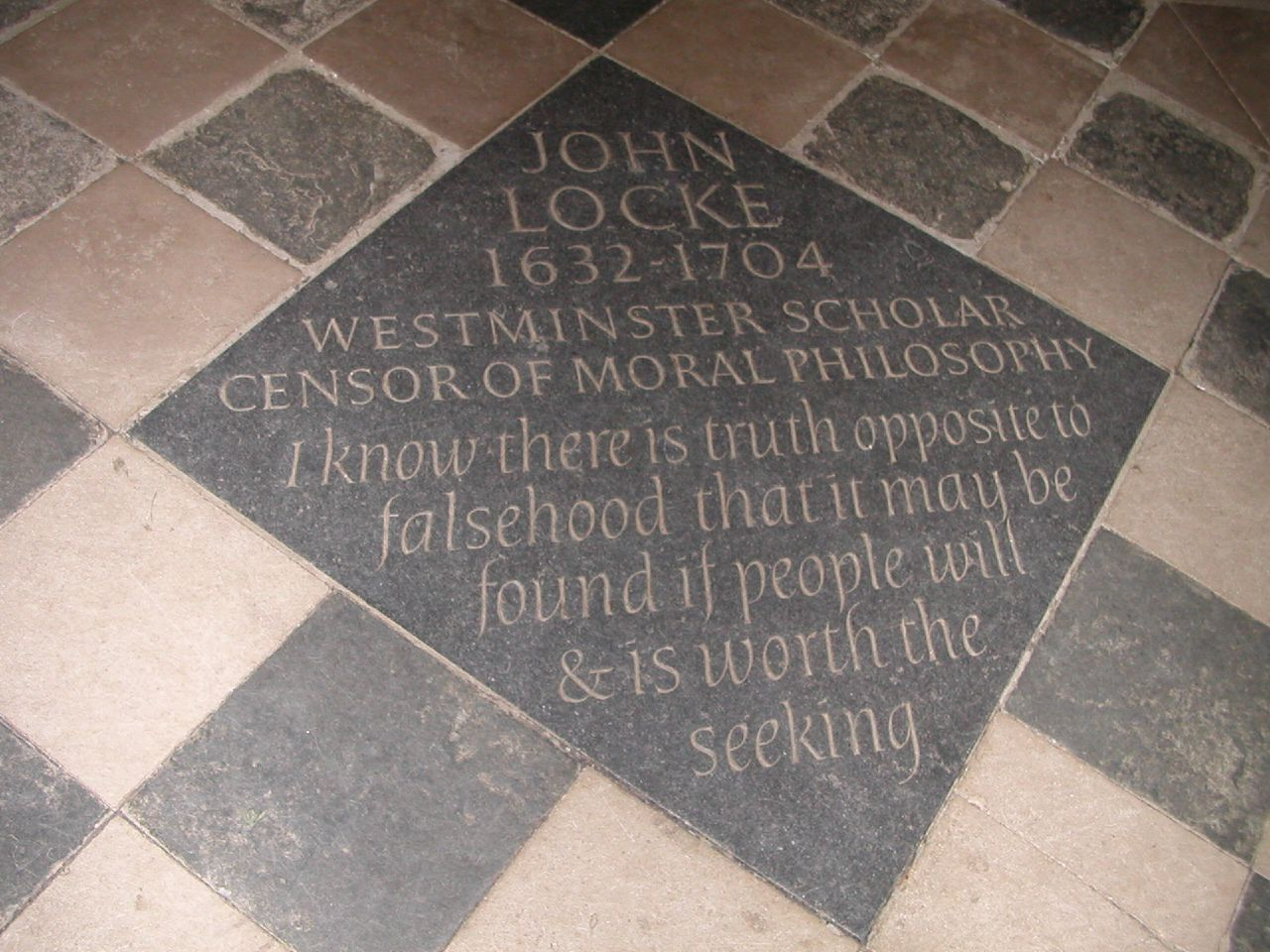
An engraved memorial plaque to Locke at Oxford

Locke was born on 29 August 1632 to Puritan parents in the village of Wrington, Somerset. His father, John Locke, Sr. (born 1606), was 23 when he married Agnes Keene, age 33. They had their first child, John, about a year later, when the couple was living in a house that had belonged to Agnes's grandparents. The boy was baptised the same day as his birth in nearby All Saints' Church. During the reign of Henry VIII, young Locke's great-grandfather, Sir William Locke, was a prosperous merchant dealing in luxury cloth. His son Nicholas Locke (d. 1648) continued in the cloth trade, as a businessman involved in the putting-out system, providing raw wool to weavers working in their homes, then collecting the finished cloth and sending it on. John Locke, Sr. was Nicholas's oldest son, who became an attorney. Soon after Locke's birth in 1632, the family moved to the market town of Pensford, about seven miles south of Bristol, into a house Nicholas gave his lawyer son. Young Locke grew up in a rural Tudor house in Belluton, where his brothers were born: Peter, who died in infancy, and Thomas (b. 1637). Locke, Sr. served as clerk to the Justices of the Peace in Chew Magna. One of the justices was Alexander Popham, a Member of Parliament for Bath and a wealthy landowner.

Young Locke was 10 at the outbreak of the English Civil War in 1642, pitting royalists supporting Charles I against Parliamentarian forces. As a Puritan, Locke's father fought for the Parliamentarian forces, who eventually won the English Civil War. He served as a captain in a cavalry under Alexander Popham. Locke, Sr.'s political choice and personal connection came to benefit his son and namesake. In 1647, young Locke's provincial life changed when he became a student at the prestigious Westminster School in London, under the sponsorship of Popham. Locke wrote of those early years, "I found myself in a storm."

At Westminster School, Locke gained the education leading to further accomplishment. Also importantly, young Locke gained entry into a network of friendship and patronage that later aided his scholarly and political career. While he was a student there, he was just a half mile away from the site of Charles I's execution following his trial by a special court created by Parliament; Westminster students were not allowed to attend it.

After completing studies at Westminster at age 20, he was admitted to Christ Church, Oxford, in the autumn of 1652. The dean of the college at the time was John Owen, vice-chancellor of the university. Although a capable student, Locke was irritated by the undergraduate curriculum of the time. He found the works of modern philosophers, such as René Descartes, more interesting than the classical material taught at the university.

Through his friend Richard Lower, whom he knew from the Westminster School, Locke was introduced to medicine and the experimental philosophy being pursued at other universities and by members of the Royal Society, founded in 1660, of which he eventually became a member.

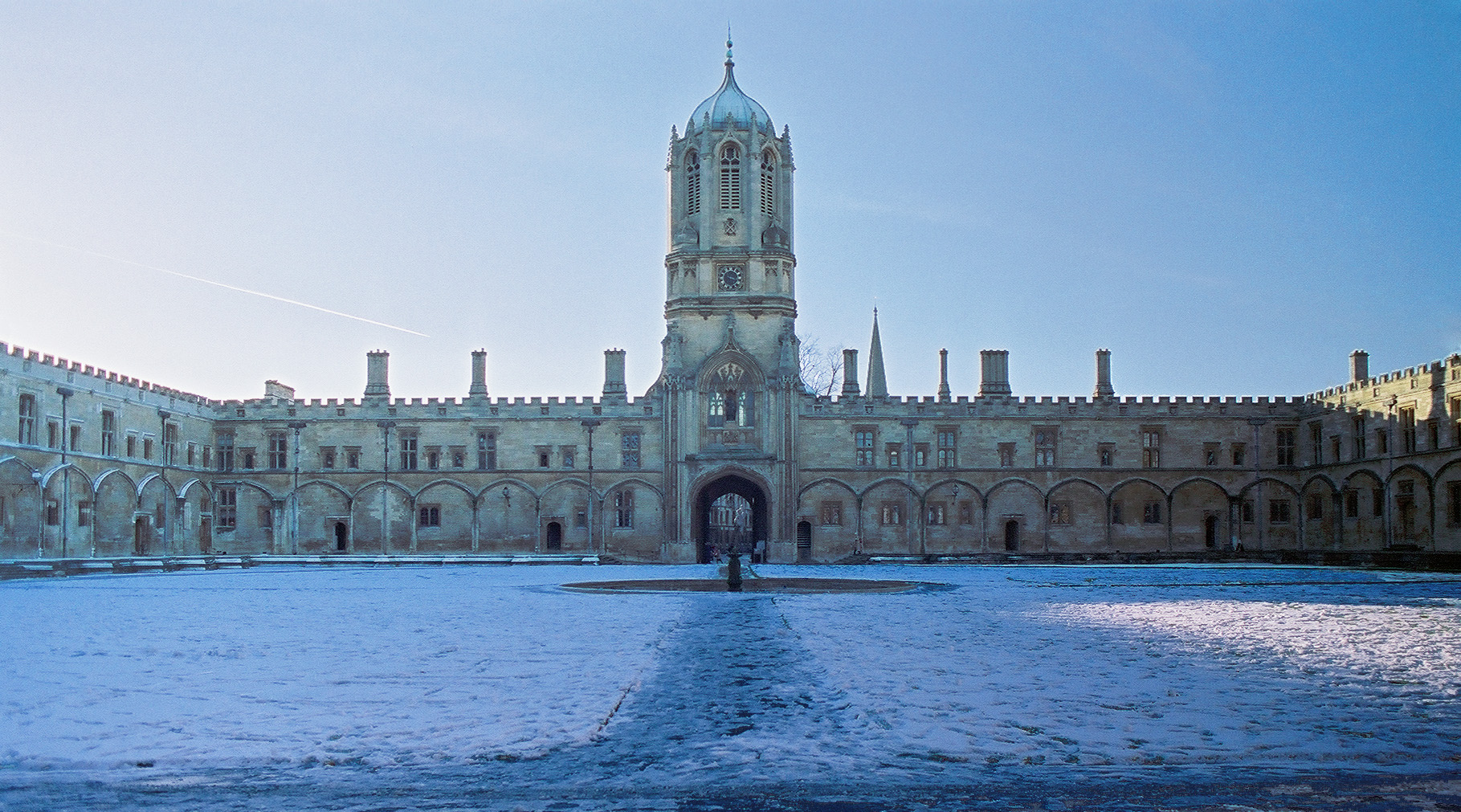
Christ Church College, Oxford

Locke was awarded a bachelor's degree in February 1656 and a master's degree in June 1658, all of which was during the Interregnum. Much later, he was awarded a bachelor of medicine in February 1675, having studied the subject extensively during his time at Oxford and served as a physician prior to formal certification.

At Oxford he worked with such noted experimental scientists and thinkers as Robert Boyle, Thomas Willis, and Robert Hooke. At Oxford, among many other things, he was exposed to Ibn Tufayl's Hayy ibn Yaqdhan translated by Edward Pococke, who influenced his perspectives on philosophy and tabula rasa.

In the modern era, there is an engraved floor memorial plaque to Locke at Christ Church Cathedral, Oxford, which also notes his connection to Westminster School.

== Career after Oxford ==
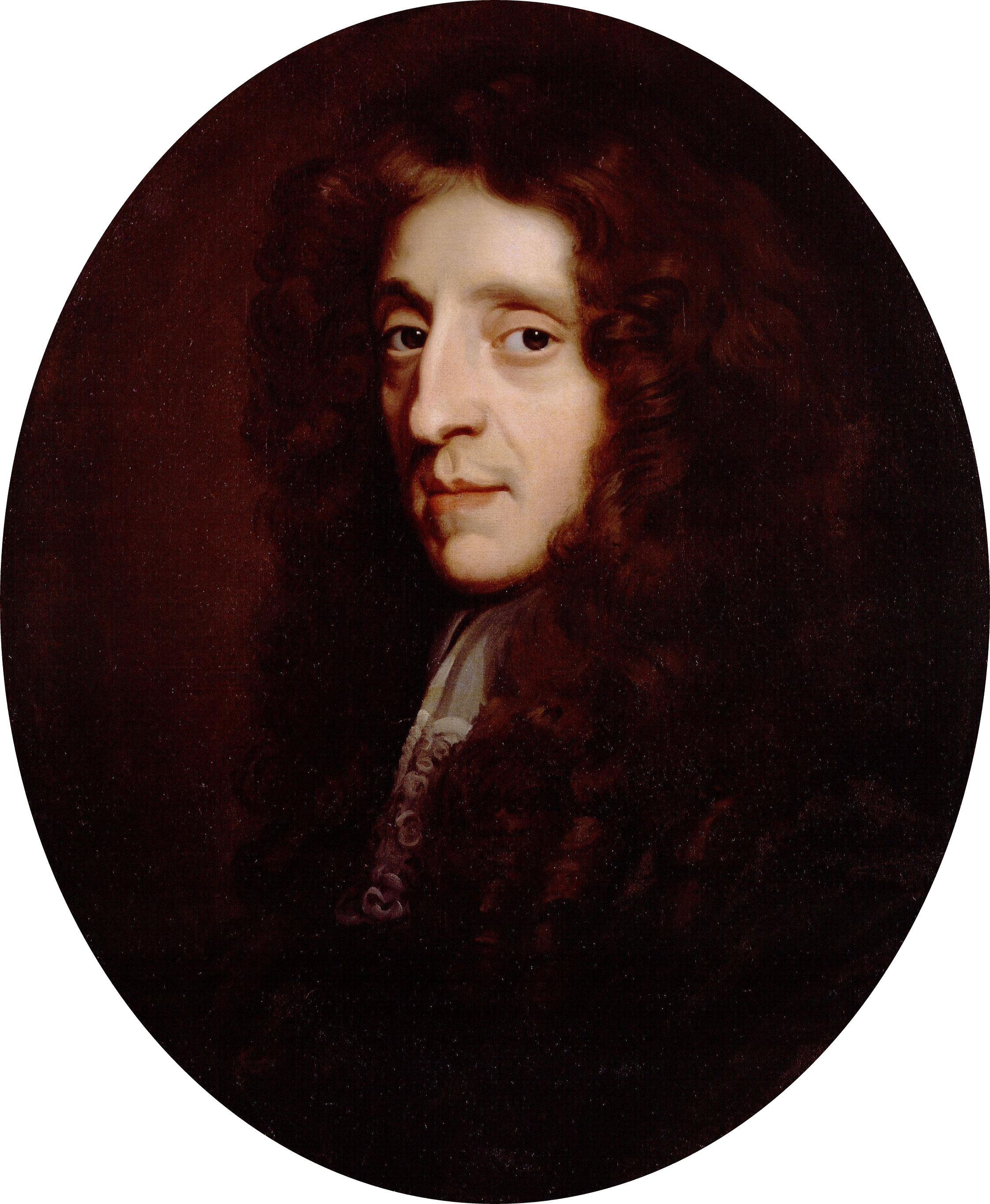
John Locke, earliest known portrait, John Greenhill c. 1672-73

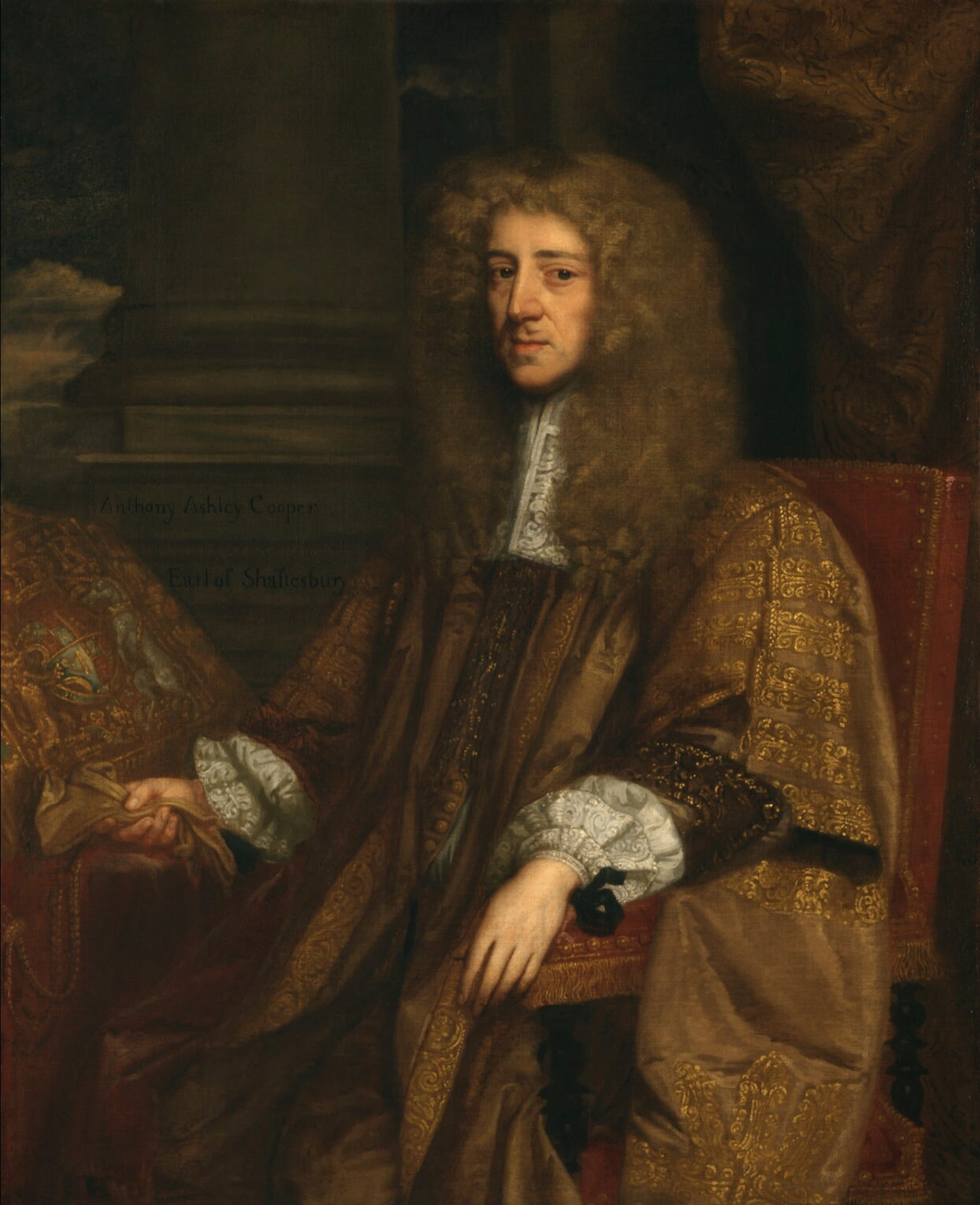
Locke's patron, Anthony Ashley Cooper, 1st Earl of Shaftesbury, painted by John Greenhill, c. 1672-73

In 1665, Locke travelled outside England for the first time, when he was appointed the secretary of Sir Walter Vane on a royal diplomatic mission to the Elector of Brandenburg. He was probably chosen through the network of contacts from his days at Westminster School who now had high influence. The diplomatic mission was a failure, but the time spent in Cleves, the capital, was still important. There he experienced a place with different religious groups, writing to his Oxford friend Robert Boyle that people "quietly permit one another to choose their way to heaven". He turned down a subsequent opportunity in a diplomatic mission to Spain and returned to Oxford.

In 1666, when Locke was 34, he met Anthony Ashley Cooper, later Lord Shaftesbury, a title by which he is now generally known. When he met Locke, he held the powerful position of Chancellor of the Exchequer; he became a key figure in Locke's life. Up until then, Locke lived a quiet scholarly life. The meeting with Shaftesbury was by chance; he was in Oxford, visiting his son. Shaftesbury wanted to drink waters from a nearby spa for a liver infection, which somehow Locke was tasked with bringing him. Shaftesbury was impressed with Locke and persuaded him to become part of his retinue. In 1667 Locke moved into Shaftesbury's London home at Exeter House on the Strand, to be his personal physician. In London, Locke resumed his medical studies under the tutelage of Thomas Sydenham. Sydenham had a major effect on Locke's natural philosophical thinking, emphasizing observation rather than a priori thinking. Locke's medical knowledge was put to the test when Shaftesbury's liver infection became life-threatening. Locke coordinated the advice of several physicians and was probably instrumental in persuading Ashley to undergo surgery (then life-threatening in itself) to remove the cyst. Shaftesbury survived and prospered, crediting Locke with saving his life.

In 1669 Ashley, one of the Lord Proprietors of Carolina, directed Locke in drafting the Fundamental Constitutions of Carolina. Sometimes it is attributed to Locke as author, but his role was more as secretary to Ashley. Locke's patron became Lord Chancellor in 1672 and then raised to the title 1st Earl of Shaftesbury in 1673. An indication of Locke's rise in status is that the first known portrait was painted by John Greenhill, around the same that Shaftesbury sat for the artist. Shaftesbury appointed Locke secretary to the Lords Proprietors and secretary to the Council of Trade and Plantations. Locke was one of the early scholars in Britain to read and own Baruch Spinoza's radical text Tractatus Theologico-Politicus in 1672, which he sold to his patron Shaftesbury in 1675, but purchased another copy to replace it. Locke took great care subsequently "to avoid being tainted by 'Spinosa'".

After Shaftesbury fell from favour in 1675, Locke left England for France on a trip already planned. He served a tutor and medical attendant to Caleb Banks. Locke traveled in France twice on extended tours, 1675–77 and 1678-79. Locke returned to England in 1679 when Shaftesbury's political fortunes took a positive turn. It has been argued that around this time, perhaps at Shaftesbury's prompting, Locke composed the bulk of the Two Treatises of Government. In the preface Locke says the Treatises were written to defend the Glorious Revolution of 1688, which ousted Catholic James II and brought Protestants William III and Mary II to the English throne, but recent scholarship suggests that the work was composed well before that. The work is now viewed as a more general argument against absolute monarchy (particularly as espoused by Robert Filmer and Thomas Hobbes) and for individual consent as the basis of political legitimacy. Although Locke was associated with the influential Whigs, his ideas about natural rights and government are considered quite revolutionary for that period in English history. Philosopher Algernon Sidney was exploring similar ideas and was executed for treason against Charles II in 1683.

=== Dutch Republic (1683–1688) ===
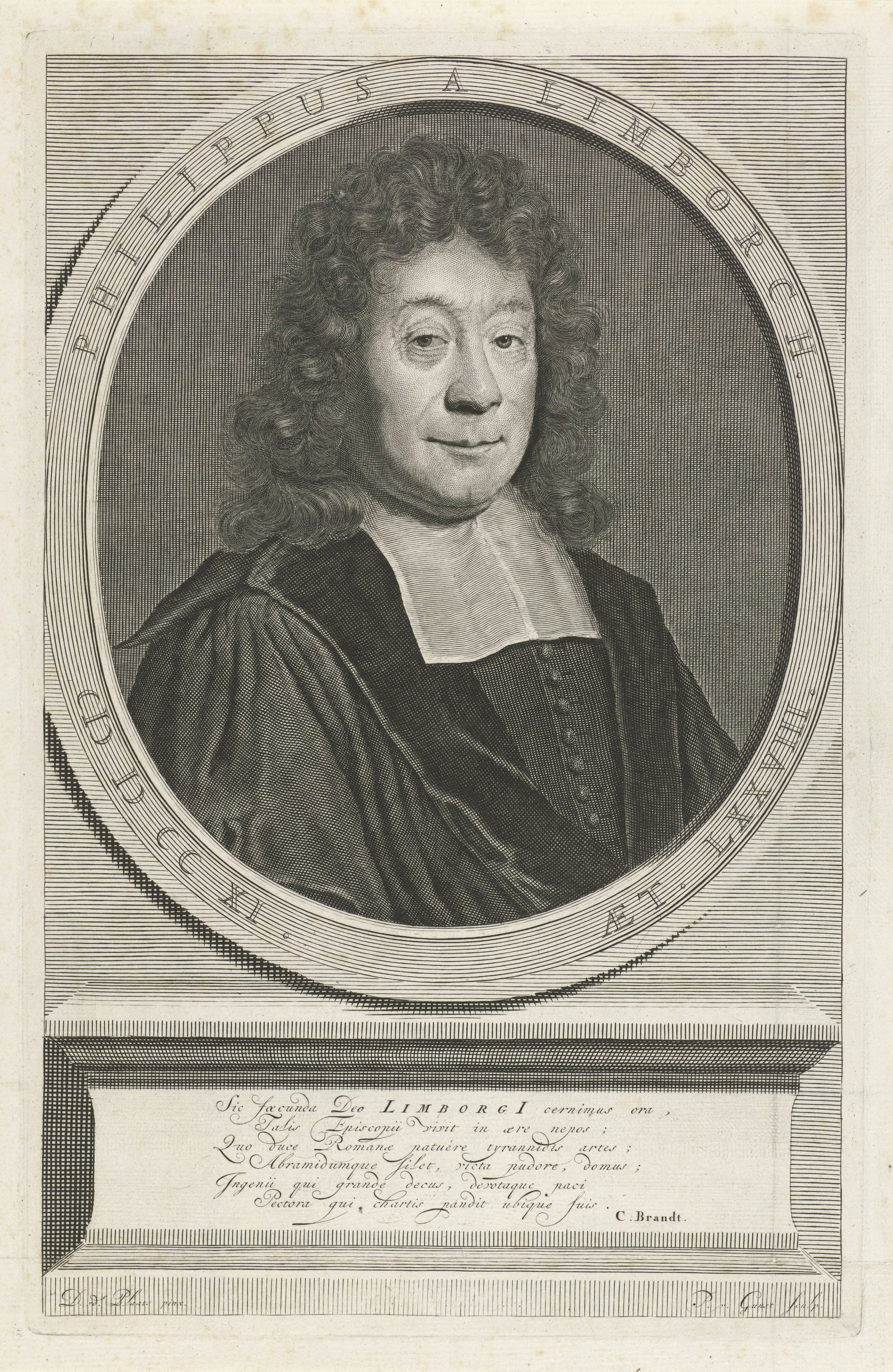
Philipp Van Limborch

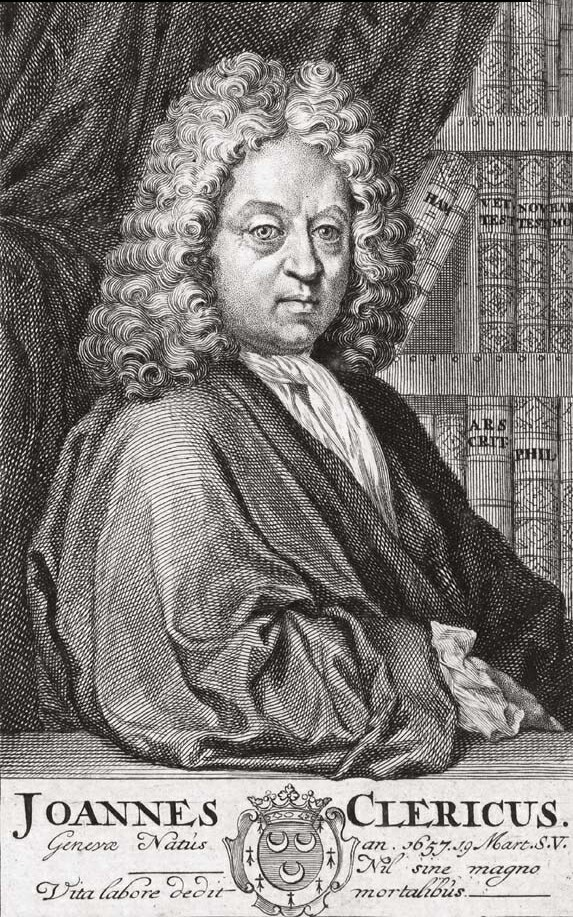
Jean LeClerc

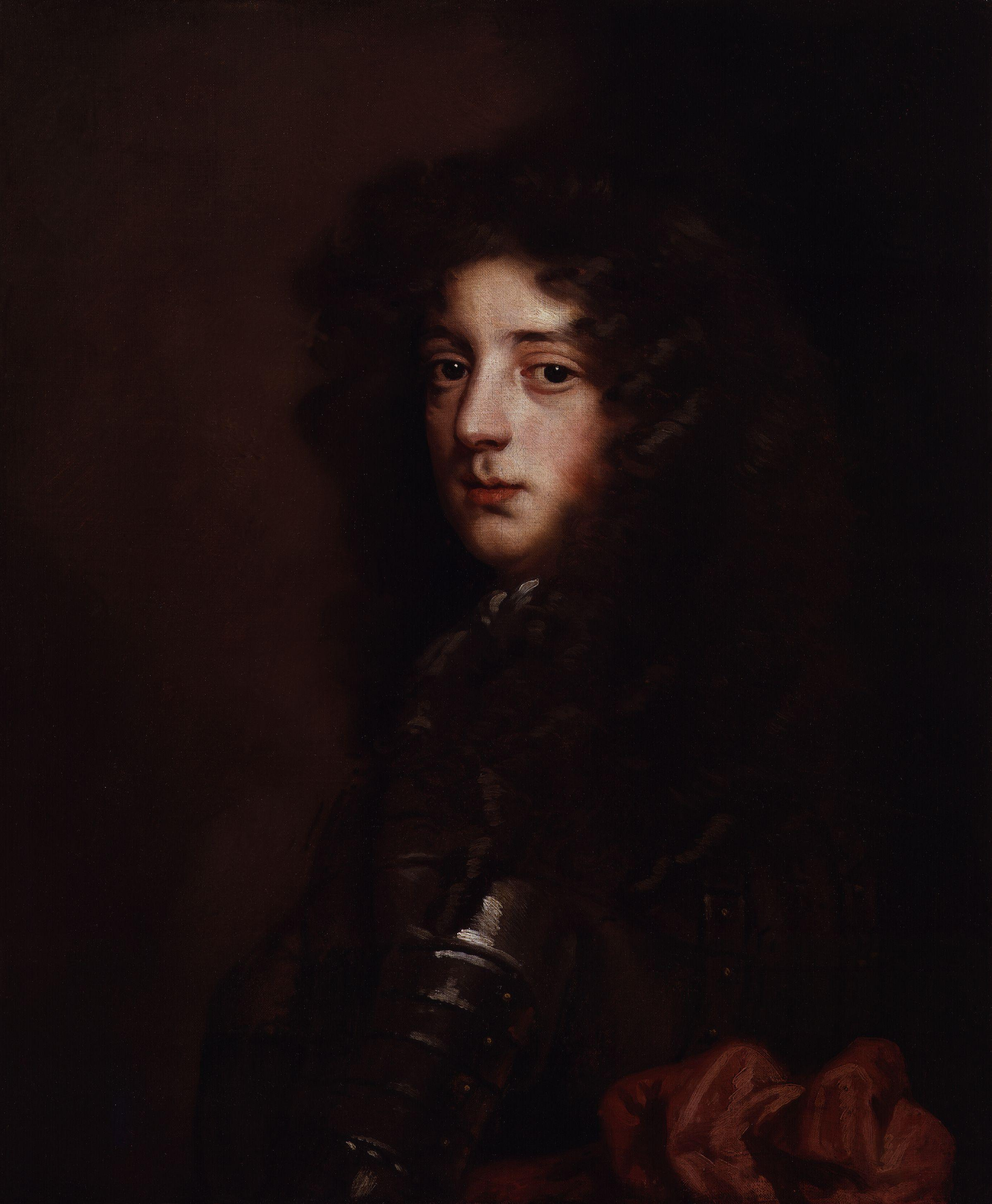
Earl of Pembroke

In 1683, Locke slipped away to the Dutch Republic in political exile, spending five years there in various cities. "His enforced exile in Holland was intellectually the most productive period of his life." While in the Netherlands, Locke had time to return to his writing. He worked on Two Treatises on Government, perhaps from an earlier draft. He spent a great deal of time working on the Essay Concerning Human Understanding. Locke sent the manuscript to Thomas Herbert, now Earl of Pembroke, whom he had met in France in the 1670s. Locke also composed the A Letter on Toleration, likely addressed to Philipp Van Limborch, the leader of the Remonstrants in Amsterdam who became a good friend. Both considered religious tolerance important to Christianity. Van Limborch was a fierce opponent of the philosophy of Baruch Spinoza's in the Tractatus Theologico-Politicus, and had aided in the publication of one of the first refutations. Among other friends he made in the Netherlands were Swiss theologian Jean LeClerc, and pioneering microscopist Antonie van Leeuwenhoek.

Beyond the reach of the crown wishing to arrest him, Locke was deprived of his connection to Oxford when in 1684, Charles II told the head of Christ Church, Oxford that Locke's senior studentship was to be revoked. His life in the Netherlands was fairly itinerant, spending time in various cities and living under a variety of aliases; he was under surveillance by British authorities and feared arrest and extradition. One pseudonym was Dr. Van Linden. It is likely that Locke knew other British political exiles in the Netherlands, but disclosure of contacts with them carried risk.

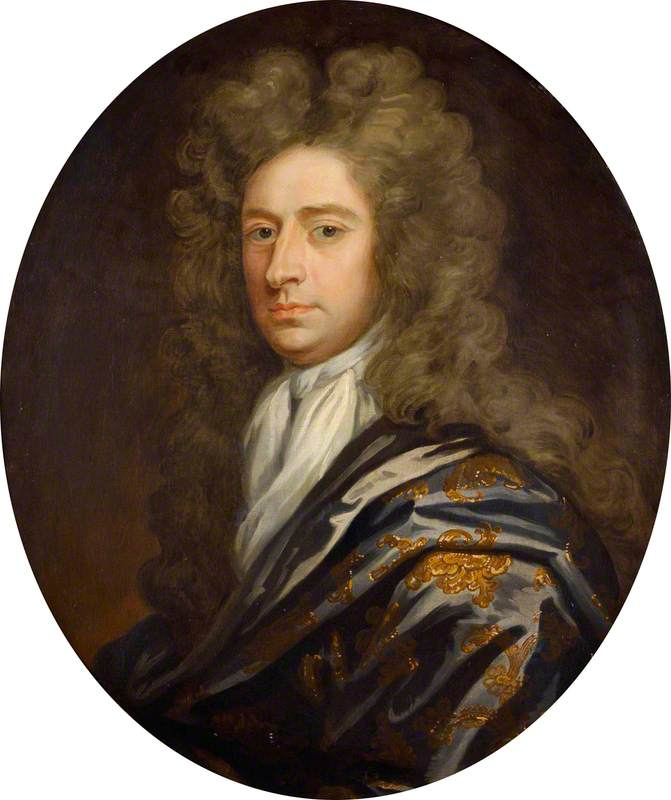
Lord Charles Mordaunt

Locke's political prospects significantly changed when James II's Catholic wife, Mary of Modena, gave birth to a son, thereby ensuring that the royal line would remain Catholic, rather than being an interlude until James's Protestant daughter Princess Mary, wed to William of Orange, succeeded to the throne. William was "invited" by Whig nobles to invade England to return it to being a Protestant nation. Lord Charles Mordaunt directly asked Locke to be part of the royal party accompanying Princess Mary to England, where she would succeed to the throne with her husband William. The invitation allowed Locke to return to England without his political that kept him in Holland for five years. He arrived in England in February 1688, aged 57. He had lost his secure place at Oxford, which would have provided a home for the rest of his life. His late patron Shaftesbury had diverted him from practicing medicine, and he had only a small independent income from properties inherited from his father. However, Locke had formed connections to Pembroke and Mordaunt, now in positions to aid him following the Revolution of 1688-89.

=== Return to England ===
With the regime change bringing William III and Mary II as joint rulers, Locke's later years found him again with powerful patrons and able to publish major philosophical works that had been in progress during his exile in Holland. The bulk of Locke's publishing took place upon his return from exile: An Essay Concerning Human Understanding, the Two Treatises of Government and A Letter Concerning Toleration, all appearing in quick succession, but only the Essay Concerning Human Understanding was he identified as the author. Locke's close friend Lady Masham invited him to join her at Oates, the Mashams' country house in Essex. Although his time there was marked by variable health from asthma attacks, he nevertheless became an intellectual hero of the Whigs. During this period, he discussed matters with such figures as John Dryden and Isaac Newton.

=== Later life and death ===
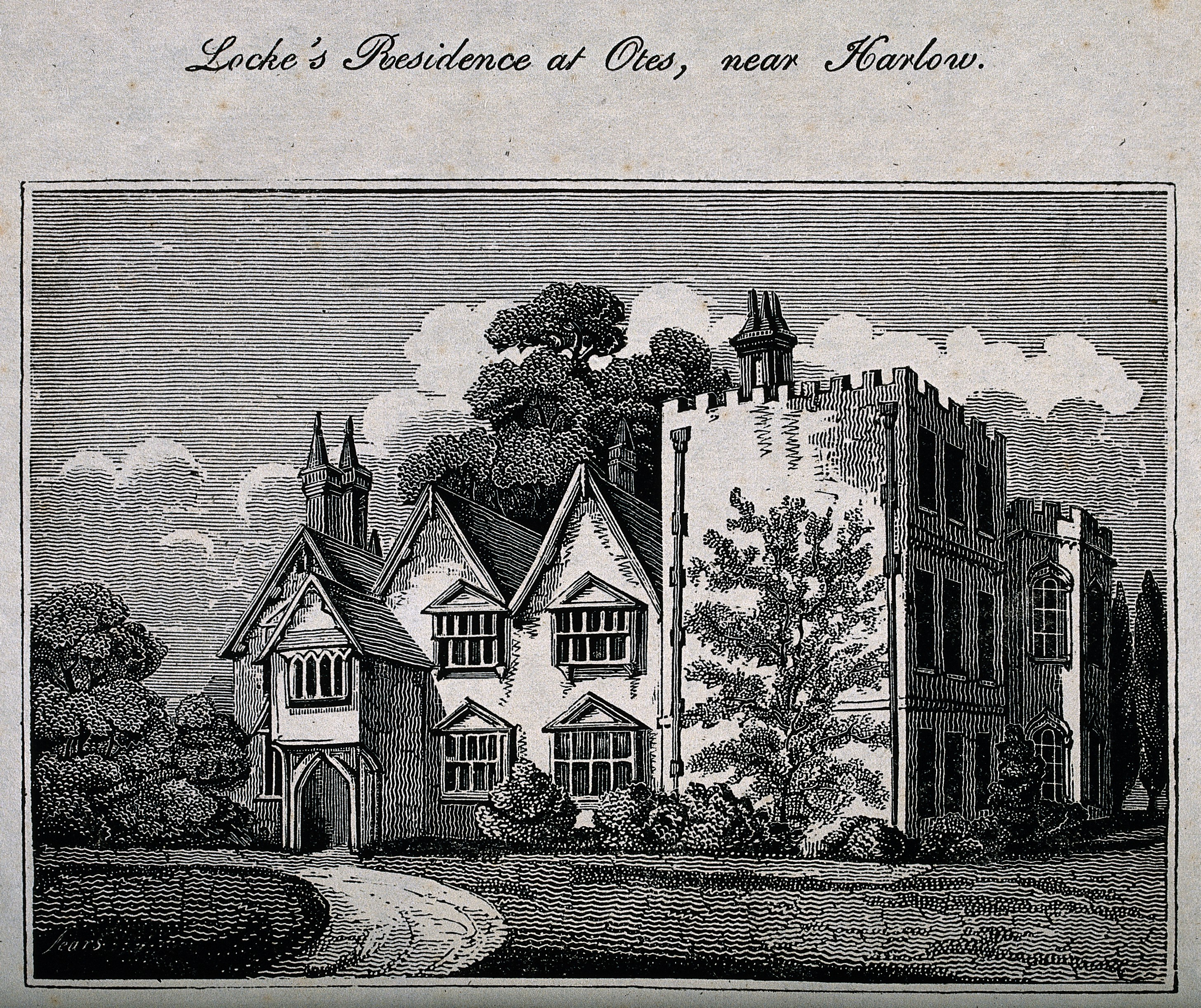
Oates Manor, High Laver, Essex

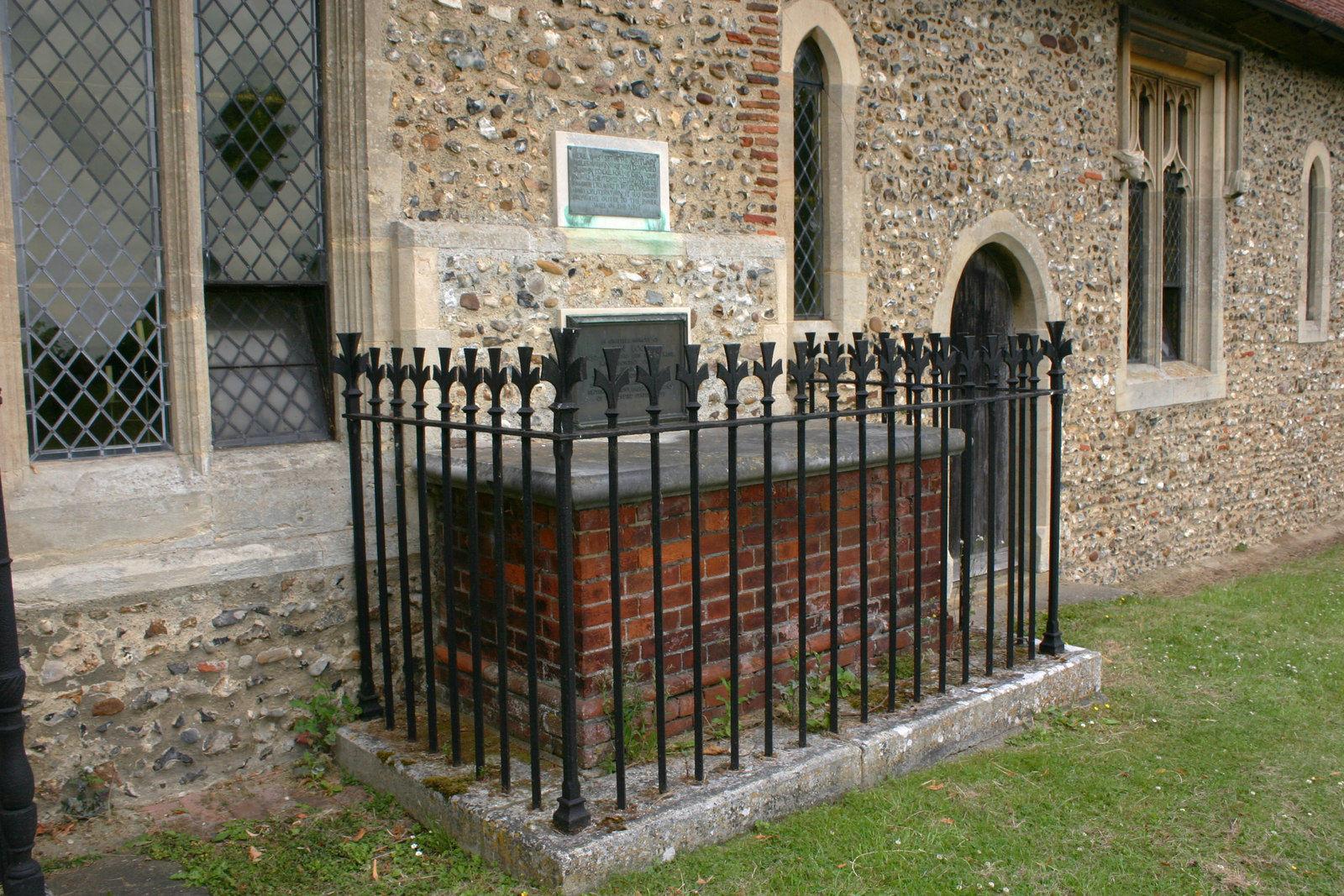
Locke's Tomb, High Laver, Essex

The iconic image of a gaunt Locke shows him in old age and poor health. He retired from his work in London to Oates Manor, living now fulltime in the household of Sir Francis Masham and his wife, the philosopher Lady Damaris Masham, Locke's friend since she was a young woman. He had been resident there since 1691 after returning from exile in Holland. After a period of increasingly poor health, he died in his rooms at Oates Manor on 28 October 1704. He is buried in the churchyard of All Saints' Church in High Laver, near Harlow in Essex, near the Mashams' house.

Locke composed his own obituary in Latin. Friends tracked down the information on his birth and added that of his death, and had the text engraved on a marble tablet. The text begins "Siste Viator, Hic juxta situs est JOHANNES LOCKE". A 19th-century Locke biographer, Henry Fox Bourne translated the text below.

Stay traveller: near this place lies JOHN LOCKE. If you ask what sort of man he was, the answer is that he was contented with his modest lot. Bred a scholar, he used his studies to devote himself to truth alone. This you may learn from his writings which will show you anything else that is to be said about him more faithfully than the doubtful eulogies of an epitaph. His virtues, if he had any, were too slight for him to offer them to his own credit or as an example to you. Let his vices be buried with him. Of good life, you have an example, should you desire it, in the gospel; of vice, would there be none for you; of mortality, surely (and you may profit by it) you have one here and everywhere. That he was born on the 29th of August in the year of our Lord 1632, and he died on the 28th of October in the year of our Lord 1704, this tablet, which will quickly perish, is a record.

== Philosophy ==
Since Locke's writings were first published in the tumultuous 17th century, they continue to be discussed and debated. Locke exercised a profound influence on political philosophy, in particular on modern liberalism. Michael Zuckert has argued that Locke launched liberalism by tempering Hobbesian absolutism and clearly separating the realms of Church and State. He had a strong influence on Voltaire, who called him "le sage Locke". His arguments concerning liberty and the social contract later influenced the written works of Thomas Jefferson. One passage from the Second Treatise is reproduced verbatim in the Declaration of Independence, the reference to a "long train of abuses". Of Locke, Jefferson wrote:

Bacon, Locke and Newton ... I consider them as the three greatest men that have ever lived, without any exception, and as having laid the foundation of those superstructures which have been raised in the Physical and Moral sciences.

Locke's influence was also important in the realm of epistemology. He redefined subjectivity, or the self, leading intellectual historians such as Charles Taylor and Jerrold Seigel to argue that Locke's An Essay Concerning Human Understanding (1689/90) marks the beginning of the modern Western conception of the self. Locke's theory of association heavily influenced the subject matter of modern psychology. At the time, Locke's recognition of two types of ideas, simple and complex—and, more importantly, their interaction through association—inspired other philosophers, such as David Hume and George Berkeley, to revise and expand this theory and apply it to explain how humans gain knowledge in the physical world. Locke thought the state's borders and the functioning and enforcement of the existence of the state and its constitution were metaphysically tied to "the natural rights of the individual", and this inspired future liberal politicians and philosophers.

=== Religious tolerance ===
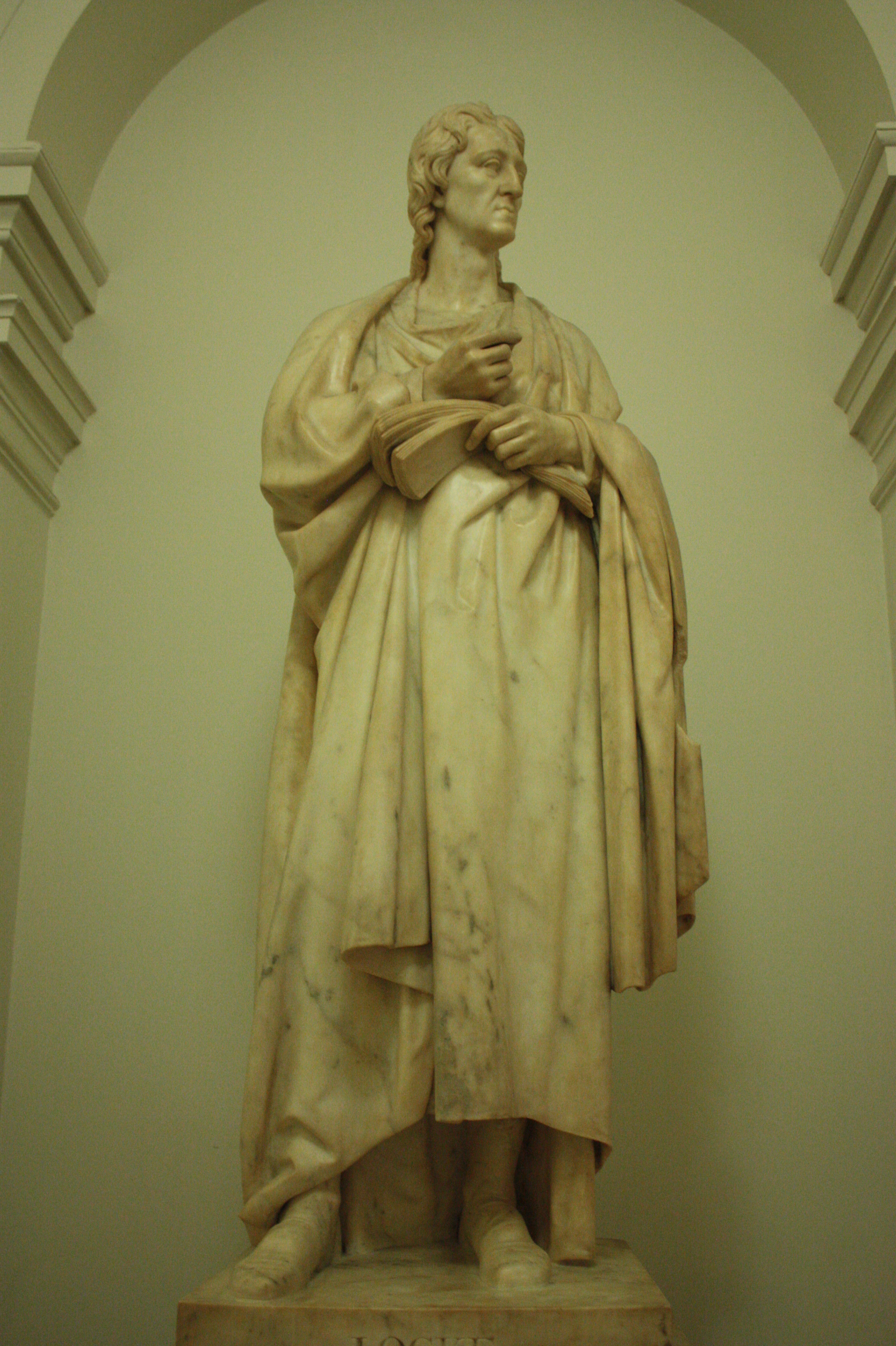
John Locke by Richard Westmacott, University College London

Writing his Letters Concerning Toleration (1689–1692) in the aftermath of the European wars of religion, Locke formulated a classic reasoning for religious tolerance, in which three arguments are central:

1. earthly judges, the state in particular, and human beings generally, cannot dependably evaluate the truth-claims of competing religious standpoints;
2. even if they could, enforcing a single 'true religion' would not have the desired effect, because belief cannot be compelled by violence;
3. coercing religious uniformity would lead to more social disorder than allowing diversity.

Locke's position on religious tolerance was influenced by Baptist theologians like John Smyth and Thomas Helwys, who had published tracts demanding freedom of conscience in the early 17th century.

Locke consistently defended toleration and naturalization of English Jews, arguing that no group in England should forfeit civil rights on the basis of religion. He understood that Jews were a part of English life and opposed proposals and measures that imposed special taxes on Jews. In his first Letter Concerning Toleration, Locke uniquely advocated toleration for Jews unconditionally, but in subsequent letters he reverted to the conventional Christian view of toleration as a means to convert Jews, reflecting his millenarian beliefs over the principle of full religious and social equality.

=== Government ===
Locke's political theory was founded upon that of social contract. Unlike Thomas Hobbes, Locke believed that human nature is characterised by reason and tolerance. Like Hobbes, Locke believed that human nature allows people to be selfish. This is apparent with the introduction of currency. In a natural state, all people were equal and independent, and everyone had a natural right to defend their "life, health, liberty, or possessions". Most scholars trace the phrase "Life, Liberty and the pursuit of Happiness" in the American Declaration of Independence to Locke's theory of rights, although other origins have been suggested.

Like Hobbes, Locke assumed that the sole right to defend in the state of nature was not enough, so people established a civil society to resolve conflicts in a civil way with help from government in a state of society. However, Locke never refers to Hobbes by name, and may instead have been responding to other writers of the day. Locke also advocated governmental separation of powers and believed that revolution is not only a right but an obligation in some circumstances. These ideas had a profound influence on the Declaration of Independence and the Constitution of the United States.

In the late 17th and early 18th centuries, however, Locke's Two Treatises of Government were rarely cited. Historian Julian Hoppit said of the book "except among some Whigs, even as a contribution to the intense debate of the 1690s it made little impression and was generally ignored until 1703, though in Oxford in 1695 it was reported to have made 'a great noise'." John Kenyon, in his study of British political debate from 1689 to 1720, has remarked that Locke's theories were "mentioned so rarely in the early stages of the [Glorious] Revolution, up to 1692, and even less thereafter, unless it was to heap abuse on them" and that "no one, including most Whigs, [was] ready for the idea of a notional or abstract contract of the kind adumbrated by Locke". In contrast, Kenyon adds that Algernon Sidney's Discourses Concerning Government were "certainly much more influential than Locke's Two Treatises." (Note: Kenyon (1977) adds: "Any unbiassed study of the position shows in fact that it was Filmer, not Hobbes, Locke or Sidney, who was the most influential thinker of the age" (p. 63).) In the 50 years after Queen Anne's death in 1714, the Two Treatises were reprinted only once, except in the collected works of Locke. With the rise of English colonies' resistance to Parliament's new taxes after the Seven Years' War, the Second Treatise of Government gained a new readership. It was frequently cited in the debates in both America and Britain. The first American printing occurred in 1773 in Boston.

=== Views on women ===
Contemporary feminist scholars of John Locke argue that his views on gender and women contain both egalitarian elements and significant limitations. Locke states that a mother shall "hath an equal title" to her children, directly challenging the assumption that fathers naturally possess superior authority. Locke rejects Robert Filmer's belief that parental power originates in Adam's authority, and to "hear the instructions of thy father, and forsake not the law of thy mother." "Locke grants women rights of contract in marriage, including the right to negotiate the terms of such contracts in matters of childcare, custody, and divorce." Although Locke seems to provide an "equal title" to women, he nevertheless frames political rights, property ownership, and entry into civil society in male terms.

Despite attributing parental authority to women, Locke claims that it is "Men who unite into commonwealths." British political theorist Carol Pateman writes that this language signals that "women are not party to the original contract that founds civil society; instead, they are the subjects over whom the contract establishes male political right." Carole Pateman and Teresa Brennan argue that political agency is assigned to men, while women remain in the domestic sphere, still withstanding equal rights. They write that "Locke assumes a free and equal female individual will always enter a marriage contract that places her in subjection to her husband, her subjection is still limited due to possessing her own 'Peculiar Right'." However, the "Peculiar right" is "excluding her from the crucial area of decision-making about family property." Mary Lyndon Shanley observes that "it appears that Locke attributed parental authority to the mother, he quickly slipped back into using the common phrase 'paternal' power rather than 'parental' power." Locke's First Treatise of Government and Second Treatise of Government present arguments in which mothers share paternal power with the father. Locke writes that a mother shall "hath an equal title" to her children, which challenges traditional paternal superiority. Although Locke includes women in parental rights, he frames political authority in terms that apply to men.

In the 18th century, Mary Wollstonecraft writes that "Mr. Locke has clearly proved that the senses are the primary source of knowledge." She states that Locke's theory of knowledge in An Essay Concerning Human Understanding emphasizes that all ideas are derived from experience and that rational development depends on education and reflection. Wollstonecraft argues that if women are denied proper education and intellectual opportunities, they are prevented from developing their own rational capacities. She contends that women are "rendered weak and wretched by a variety of concurring causes" and that society trains them to be "alluring mistresses rather than rational wives." Since Locke emphasizes rationality and knowledge equally apply to women, Wollstonecraft argues that failure to provide these conditions reinforces their dependence and subordination.

=== Slavery ===
Locke's views on slavery were multifaceted. Although he wrote against slavery in general, he was briefly an investor and beneficiary of the slave-trading Royal Africa Company. Locke was secretary to the Earl of Shaftesbury, one of the Lord Proprietors of Carolina granted territory by Charles II, and a previous investor in the sugar colony of Barbados. Locke was directed to draft the Fundamental Constitutions of Carolina, which established a quasi-feudal aristocracy and gave Carolinian planters absolute power over their enslaved chattel property; the constitutions pledged that "every freeman of Carolina shall have absolute power and authority over his negro slaves".

Philosopher Martin Cohen observes that Locke, as secretary to the Council of Trade and Plantations and a member of the Board of Trade, was "one of just half a dozen men who created and supervised both the colonies and their iniquitous systems of servitude". According to historian James Farr, Locke never expressed any thoughts about his contradictory opinions of slavery, which Farr ascribes to his personal involvement in the Atlantic slave trade. Locke's positions on slavery have been described as hypocritical, and laying the foundation for the Founding Fathers to hold similarly contradictory thoughts regarding freedom and slavery.

Historian Holly Brewer argues that Locke's role in the Constitutions has been exaggerated and that he was merely paid to revise and make copies of a document that had already been partially written before he became involved as Shaftesbury's secretary; she compares Locke's role to a lawyer writing a will. She states that Locke was paid in Royal African Company stock in lieu of money for his work as a secretary for a governmental sub-committee, and that he sold the stock after a few years. Brewer likewise argues that Locke actively worked to undermine slavery in Virginia while heading a Board of Trade created by William of Orange following the Glorious Revolution. He specifically attacked colonial policy granting land to slave owners and encouraged the baptism and Christian education of the children of enslaved Africans to undercut a major justification of slavery—that they were heathens who possessed no rights.

=== Child labour ===
Locke wrote in support of child labour. In his "Essay on the Poor Law", he discusses the education of the poor; he laments that "the children of labouring people are an ordinary burden to the parish, and are usually maintained in idleness, so that their labour also is generally lost to the public till they are 12 or 14 years old". He suggests the setting up of "working schools" for poor children in each parish in England so that they will be "from infancy [three years old] inured to work". He goes on to outline the economics of these schools, arguing not only that they will be profitable for the parish, but also that they will instill a good work ethic in the children.

=== Animals ===
Locke rejected the Cartesian view that animals are mere automata without consciousness. In his Essay Concerning Human Understanding, he argued that animals possess some cognitive faculties, particularly perception and memory, though not abstraction or reasoning in the human sense. Locke maintained that perception is present "in some degree, in all sorts of animals", including even oysters and cockles, though he described their sensations as "dull". He further held that animals are capable of retaining ideas, but he denied them the capacity for forming abstract or general ideas, which he regarded as a defining feature of human cognition.

Locke used these observations to challenge Descartes's animal machine doctrine and to support the possibility that matter could think, if God so willed. This hypothesis, that God might superadd thought to matter, allowed Locke to argue that mental faculties could be distributed in varying degrees among animals and humans. Locke sometimes used these arguments rhetorically against theological opponents, but was cautious about committing to the immateriality or immortality of animal souls. Instead, he suggested that attributing mental faculties to animals did not necessitate belief in their immortality, thereby avoiding the theological implications Descartes sought to escape by denying animal sentience altogether.

== Ideas ==
=== Economics ===
==== On price theory ====
Locke's general theory of value and price is a supply-and-demand theory, set out in a letter to a member of parliament in 1691, titled Some Considerations on the Consequences of the Lowering of Interest and the Raising of the Value of Money. The quantity theory of money forms a special case of this general theory. His idea is based on "money answers all things" (Ecclesiastes) or "rent of money is always sufficient, or more than enough" and "varies very little". Locke concludes that, as far as money is concerned, the demand for it is exclusively regulated by its quantity, regardless of whether the demand is unlimited or constant. He also investigates the determinants of demand and supply. For supply, he explains the value of goods as based on their scarcity and ability to be exchanged and consumed. He explains demand for goods as based on their ability to yield a flow of income. Locke develops an early theory of capitalisation, such as of land, which has value because "by its constant production of saleable commodities it brings in a certain yearly income". He considers the demand for money as almost the same as demand for goods or land: it depends on whether money is wanted as medium of exchange. As a medium of exchange, he states that "money is capable by exchange to procure us the necessaries or conveniences of life", and for loanable funds "it comes to be of the same nature with land by yielding a certain yearly income ... or interest".

==== Monetary thoughts ====
Locke distinguishes two functions of money: as a counter to measure value, and as a pledge to lay claim to goods. He believes that silver and gold, as opposed to paper money, are the appropriate currency for international transactions. Silver and gold, he says, are treated to have equal value by all of humanity and can thus be treated as a pledge by anyone, while the value of paper money is only valid under the government which issues it.

Locke argues that a country should seek a favourable balance of trade, lest it fall behind other countries and suffer a loss in its trade. Since the world money stock grows constantly, a country must constantly seek to enlarge its own stock. Locke develops his theory of foreign exchanges, by which in addition to commodity movements, there are also movements in country stock of money, and movements of capital determine exchange rates. He considers the latter less significant and less volatile than commodity movements. As for a country's money stock, if it is large relative to that of other countries, he says it will cause the country's exchange to rise above par, as an export balance would do.

Locke prepares estimates of the cash requirements for different economic groups (landholders, labourers, and brokers). In each group he posits that the cash requirements are closely related to the length of the pay period. He argues the brokers—the middlemen—whose activities enlarge the monetary circuit and whose profits eat into the earnings of labourers and landholders, have a negative influence on both personal and the public economy to which they supposedly contribute.

==== Theory of value and property ====
Locke uses the concept of property in both broad and narrow terms: broadly, it covers a wide range of human interests and aspirations; more particularly, it refers to material goods. He argues that property is a natural right that is derived from labour. In Chapter V of his Second Treatise, Locke argues that the individual ownership of goods and property is justified by the labour exerted to produce such goods—"at least where there is enough [land], and as good, left in common for others" (para. 27)—or to use property to produce goods beneficial to human society.

Locke states in his Second Treatise that nature on its own provides little of value to society, implying that the labour expended in the creation of goods gives them their value. From this premise, understood as a labour theory of value, Locke developed a labour theory of property, whereby ownership of property is created by the application of labour. In addition, he believed that property precedes government and government cannot "dispose of the estates of the subjects arbitrarily". Karl Marx later critiqued Locke's theory of property in his own social theory.

==== Accumulation of wealth ====
According to Locke, unused property is wasteful and an offence against nature, but, with the introduction of "durable" goods, men could exchange their excessive perishable goods for those which would last longer and thus not offend the natural law. In his view, the introduction of money marked the culmination of this process, making possible the unlimited accumulation of property without causing waste through spoilage. He includes gold or silver as money because they may be "hoarded up without injury to anyone", as they do not spoil or decay in the hands of the possessor. In his view, the introduction of money eliminates limits to accumulation. Locke stresses that inequality has come about by tacit agreement on the use of money, not by the social contract establishing civil society or the law of land regulating property. Locke was aware of a problem posed by unlimited accumulation, but did not consider it his task. He just implies that government would function to moderate the conflict between the unlimited accumulation of property and a more nearly equal distribution of wealth; he does not say which principles government should apply to solve this problem. Not all elements of his thought form a consistent whole. For example, the labour theory of value in the Two Treatises of Government stands side by side with the demand-and-supply theory of value developed in a letter he wrote titled Some Considerations on the Consequences of the Lowering of Interest and the Raising of the Value of Money. Moreover, Locke anchors property in labour but, in the end, upholds unlimited accumulation of wealth.

=== The human mind ===
==== The self ====
Locke defines the self as "that conscious thinking thing, (whatever substance, made up of whether spiritual, or material, simple, or compounded, it matters not) which is sensible, or conscious of pleasure and pain, capable of happiness or misery, and so is concerned for itself, as far as that consciousness extends". He does not wholly ignore "substance", writing that "the body too goes to the making the man". In his Essay, Locke explains the gradual unfolding of this conscious mind. Arguing against both the Augustinian view of man as originally sinful and the Cartesian position, which holds that man innately knows basic logical propositions, Locke posits an 'empty mind', a tabula rasa, which is shaped by experience, sensations and reflections being the two sources of all our ideas. He writes in An Essay Concerning Human Understanding:

This source of ideas every man has wholly within himself; and though it be not sense, as having nothing to do with external objects, yet it is very like it, and might properly enough be called 'internal sense.'

Locke's Some Thoughts Concerning Education is an outline on how to educate this mind. Drawing on thoughts expressed in letters written to Mary Clarke and her husband about their son, he expresses the belief that education makes the man—or, more fundamentally, that the mind is an "empty cabinet":

I think I may say that of all the men we meet with, nine parts of ten are what they are, good or evil, useful or not, by their education.

Locke also wrote, "the little and almost insensible impressions on our tender infancies have very important and lasting consequences". He argues that the "associations of ideas" one makes when young are more important than those made later because they are the foundation of the self; they are, put differently, what first mark the tabula rasa. In his Essay, in which both these concepts are introduced, Locke warns, for example, against letting "a foolish maid" convince a child that "goblins and sprites" are associated with the night, for "darkness shall ever afterwards bring with it those frightful ideas, and they shall be so joined, that he can no more bear the one than the other".

This theory came to be called associationism. It strongly influenced 18th-century thought, particularly educational theory, as nearly every educational writer warned parents not to allow their children to develop negative associations. It also led to the development of psychology and other new disciplines with David Hartley's attempt to discover a biological mechanism for associationism in his Observations on Man (1749).

==== Dream argument ====
Locke was critical of Descartes's version of the dream argument, making the counter-argument that people cannot have physical pain in dreams as they do in waking life.

=== Religion ===
==== Religious beliefs ====
Some scholars have seen Locke's political convictions as based on his religious beliefs. Locke's parents were Puritans, so his religious trajectory began in Calvinist trinitarianism. By the time of the Reflections (1695) Locke was advocating not just Socinian views on tolerance but also Socinian Christology. Wainwright (1987) notes that in the posthumously published Paraphrase (1707) Locke's interpretation of one verse, Ephesians 1:10, is markedly different from that of Socinians such as Biddle, and may indicate that near the end of his life Locke returned nearer to an Arian position, thereby accepting Christ's pre-existence.

Locke was at times unsure about the subject of original sin, so he was accused of Socinianism, Arianism, or Deism. Locke argued that the idea that "all Adam's Posterity [are] doomed to Eternal Infinite Punishment, for the Transgression of Adam" was "little consistent with the Justice or Goodness of the Great and Infinite God", leading Eric Nelson to associate him with Pelagian ideas. However, he did not deny the reality of evil. He believed that humans were capable of waging unjust wars and committing crimes and that criminals had to be punished, even with the death penalty.

With regard to the Bible, Locke was very conservative. He retained the doctrine of the verbal inspiration of the Scriptures, considering miracles to be proof of the divine nature of the biblical message. Locke was convinced that the entire content of the Bible was in agreement with human reason (The Reasonableness of Christianity, 1695). Although Locke was an advocate of tolerance, he urged the authorities not to tolerate atheism, because he thought denial of God's existence undermined the social order and led to chaos. That excluded all atheistic varieties of philosophy and all attempts to deduce ethics and natural law from purely secular premises. In Locke's opinion the cosmological argument was valid and proved God's existence. His political thought was based on Protestant Christian views. Locke advocated a sense of piety out of gratitude to God for giving reason to men.

Locke engaged deeply with contemporary theological debates about the restoration of the Jews to the Land of Israel. He came to these views through close study of Seder Odor by Franciscus Mercurius van Helmont and by theological exchanges with Isaac Newton. In his notes on Romans 11:23, Locke interpreted Paul's metaphor of Jews being "grafted in again" as indicating that the Jews would one day flourish anew as a people, profess Christianity, and be restored to the land promised to the patriarchs. This interpretation aligned with his earlier statements in The Reasonableness of Christianity (1695), where he emphasized that first-century Jews lived in expectation of the Messiah and a divinely established kingdom. His theological framework shaped his evangelical view of contemporary Jews as a community ultimately destined for conversion and a state of their own.

==== Philosophy from religion ====
Locke's concept of man started with the belief in creation. Like philosophers Hugo Grotius and Samuel Pufendorf, Locke equated natural law with biblical revelation. Locke derived the fundamental concepts of his political theory from biblical texts, in particular from Genesis 1 and 2 (creation), the Decalogue, the Golden Rule, the teachings of Jesus, and the letters of Paul the Apostle. The Decalogue puts a person's life, reputation and property under God's protection. Locke's philosophy on liberty is also derived from the Bible. Locke derived from the Bible basic human equality, including equality of the sexes, the starting point of the theological doctrine of Imago Dei.

To Locke, one of the consequences of the principle of equality was that all humans were created equally free and therefore governments needed the consent of the governed. Locke compared the English monarchy's rule over the British people to Adam's rule over Eve in Genesis, which was appointed by God. Following Locke's philosophy, the American Declaration of Independence founded human rights partially on the biblical belief in creation. Locke's doctrine that governments need the consent of the governed is also central to the Declaration of Independence.

== Locke's library ==
=== Manuscripts, books and treatises ===
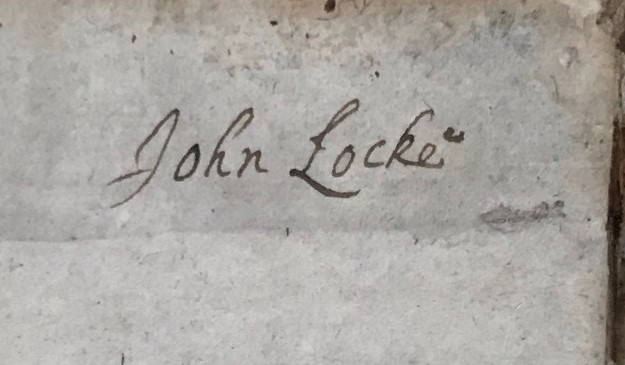
Locke's signature in Bodleian Locke 13.12. Photo taken at the Bodleian Library, Oxford.

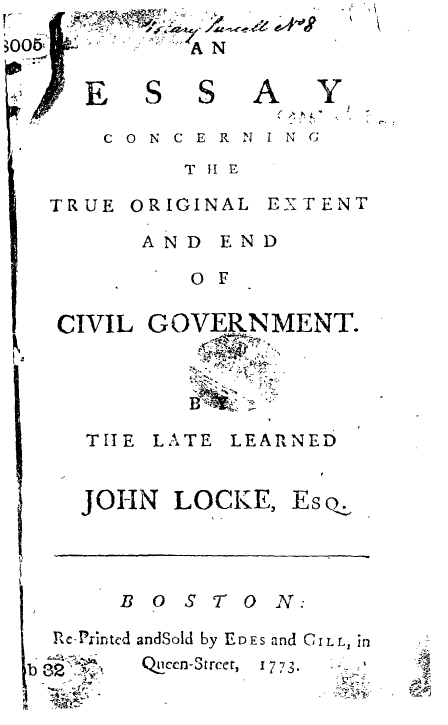
The only edition of the Treatises published in America during the 18th century (1773)

Locke was an assiduous book collector and notetaker throughout his life. By his death in 1704, Locke had amassed a library of more than 3,000 books, a significant number in the seventeenth century. Unlike some of his contemporaries, Locke took care to catalogue and preserve his library, and his will made specific provisions for how his library was to be distributed after his death. Locke's will offered Lady Masham the choice of "any four folios, eight quartos and twenty books of less volume, which she shall choose out of the books in my Library." Locke also gave six titles to his "good friend" Anthony Collins, but Locke bequeathed the majority of his collection to his cousin Peter King (later Lord King) and to Lady Masham's son, Francis Cudworth Masham.

Lady Masham's son, Francis, was promised one "moiety" (half) of Locke's library when he reached "the age of one and twenty years." The other "moiety" of Locke's books, along with his manuscripts, passed to his cousin King. Over the next two centuries, the Masham portion of Locke's library was dispersed. The manuscripts and books left to King remained with King's descendants (later the Earls of Lovelace), until most of the collection was bought by the Bodleian Library, Oxford in 1947. Another portion of the books Locke left to King was discovered by the collector and philanthropist Paul Mellon in 1951. Mellon supplemented this discovery with books from Locke's library which he bought privately, and in 1978, he transferred his collection to the Bodleian.

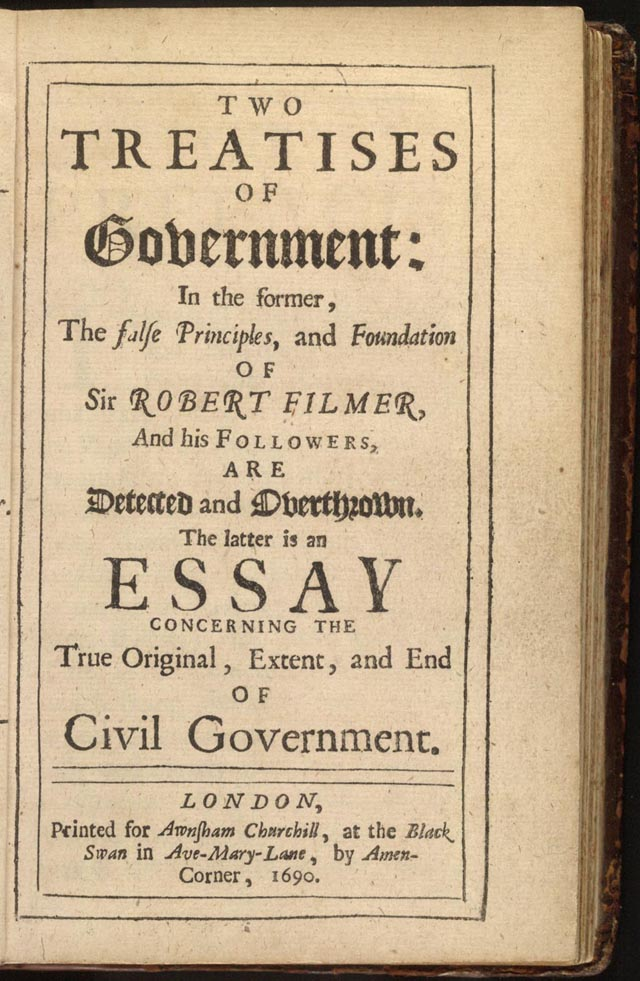
One of Locke's famous books on politics, Two Treatises of Government, written and published in his lifetime

The holdings in the Locke Room at the Bodleian have been a valuable resource for scholars interested in Locke, his philosophy, practices for information management, and the history of the book. Many of the books still contain Locke's signature, which he often made on the pastedowns of his books. Many also include Locke's marginalia. The printed books in Locke's library reflected his various intellectual interests as well as his movements at different stages of his life. Locke travelled extensively in France and the Netherlands during the 1670s and 1680s, and during this time he acquired many books from the continent.

Only half of the books in Locke's library were printed in England, while close to 40% came from France and the Netherlands. These books cover a wide range of subjects. According to John Harrison and Peter Laslett, the largest genres in Locke's library were theology (23.8% of books), medicine (11.1%), politics and law (10.7%), and classical literature (10.1%). The Bodleian library currently holds more than 800 of the books from Locke's library. These include Locke's copies of works by several of the most influential figures of the seventeenth century, including:

- The Quaker William Penn: An address to Protestants of all perswasions (Bodleian Locke 7.69a)
- The explorer Francis Drake: The world encompassed by Sir Francis Drake (Bodleian Locke 8.37c)
- The scientist Robert Boyle: A discourse of things above reason (Bodleian Locke 7.272)
- The bishop and historian Thomas Sprat: The history of the Royal-Society of London (Bodleian Locke 9.10a)

In addition to books owned by Locke, the Bodleian possesses more than 100 manuscripts related to Locke or written in his hand. Like the books in Locke's library, these manuscripts display a range of interests and provide different windows into Locke's activity and relationships. Several of the manuscripts include letters to and from acquaintances like Peter King (MS Locke b. 6) and Nicolas Toinard (MS Locke c. 45). MS Locke f. 1–10 contain Locke's journals for most years between 1675 and 1704.

Some of the most significant manuscripts include early drafts of Locke's writings, such as his Essay Concerning Human Understanding (MS Locke f. 26). The Bodleian also holds a copy of Robert Boyle's General History of the Air with corrections and notes Locke made while preparing Boyle's work for posthumous publication (MS Locke c. 37 ). Other manuscripts contain unpublished works. Among others, MS. Locke e. 18 includes some of Locke's thoughts on the Glorious Revolution, which Locke sent to his friend Edward Clarke but never published.

One of the largest categories of manuscript at the Bodleian comprises Locke's notebooks and commonplace books. The scholar Richard Yeo calls Locke a "Master Note-taker" and explains that "Locke's methodical note-taking pervaded most areas of his life." In an unpublished essay "Of Study," Locke argued that a notebook should work like a "chest-of-drawers" for organising information, which would be a "great help to the memory and means to avoid confusion in our thoughts." Locke kept several notebooks and commonplace books, which he organised according to topic. MS Locke c. 43 includes Locke's notes on theology, while MS Locke f. 18–24 contain medical notes. Other notebooks, such as MS c. 43, incorporate several topics in the same notebook, but separated into sections.

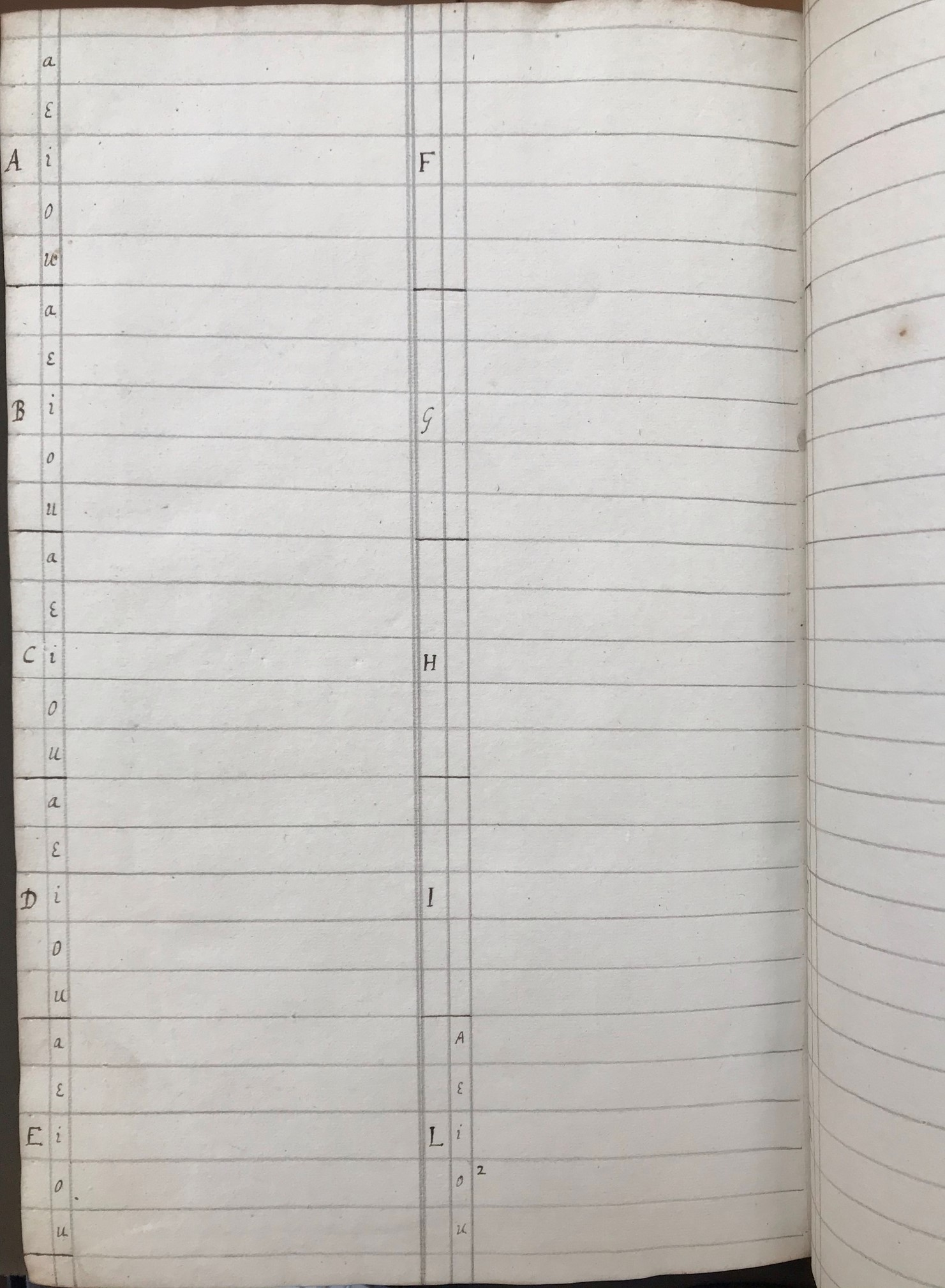
Page 1 of Locke's unfinished index in Bodleian Locke 13.12. Photo taken at the Bodleian Library, Oxford.

These commonplace books were highly personal and were designed to be used by Locke himself rather than accessible to a wide audience. Locke's notes are often abbreviated and are full of codes which he used to reference material across notebooks. Another way Locke personalised his notebooks was by devising his own method of creating indexes using a grid system and Latin keywords. Instead of recording entire words, his indexes shortened words to their first letter and vowel. Thus, the word "Epistle" would be classified as "Ei".

Locke published his method in French in 1686, and it was republished posthumously in English in 1706. Some of the books in Locke's library at the Bodleian are a combination of manuscript and print. Locke had some of his books interleaved, meaning that they were bound with blank sheets in-between the printed pages to enable annotations. Locke interleaved and annotated his five volumes of the New Testament in French, Greek, and Latin (Bodleian Locke 9.103–107). Locke did the same with his copy of Thomas Hyde's Bodleian Library catalogue (Bodleian Locke 16.17), which Locke used to create a catalogue of his own library.

== Writing ==
=== List of major works ===
- 1689. A Letter Concerning Toleration.
  - 1690. A Second Letter Concerning Toleration
  - 1692. A Third Letter for Toleration
- 1689/90. Two Treatises of Government (published throughout the 18th century by London bookseller Andrew Millar by commission for Thomas Hollis)
- 1689/90. An Essay Concerning Human Understanding
- 1691. Some Considerations on the consequences of the Lowering of Interest and the Raising of the Value of Money
- 1693. Some Thoughts Concerning Education
- 1695. The Reasonableness of Christianity, as Delivered in the Scriptures
  - 1695. A Vindication of the Reasonableness of Christianity

=== Major posthumous manuscripts ===
- Two Tracts on Government
  - 1660. First Tract of Government (or the English Tract)
  - c.1662. Second Tract of Government (or the Latin Tract)
- 1664. Questions Concerning the Law of Nature.
- 1667. Essay Concerning Toleration
- 1706. Of the Conduct of the Understanding
- 1707. A paraphrase and notes on the Epistles of St. Paul to the Galatians, 1 and 2 Corinthians, Romans, Ephesians

== See also ==
- List of liberal theorists
