= Samuel de Sorbiere =

French physician, man of letters, philosopher and translator

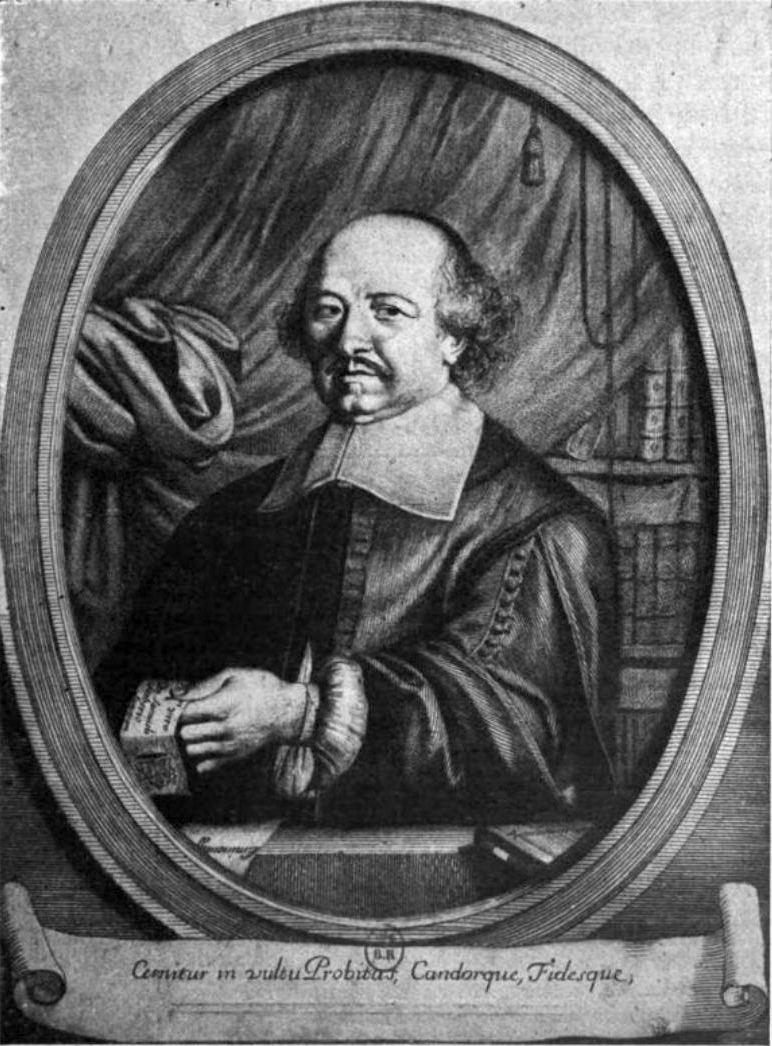
- Samuel de Sorbiere
- Born: 17 September 1615; Saint-Ambroix, Languedoc, France
- Died: 9 April 1670 (aged 54); Paris, France
- Medical career
- Profession: Physician

Samuel (de) Sorbière (French: [sɔʁbjɛʁ]; 17 September 1615 – 9 April 1670) was a French physician and man of letters, a philosopher and translator, who is best known for his promotion of the works of Thomas Hobbes and Pierre Gassendi, in whose view of physics he placed his support, though unable to refute René Descartes, but who developed a reputation in his own day for a truculent and disputatious nature. Sorbière is regarded often by his position on ethics and disclosure about medical mistakes. In 1672 Sorbière considered the idea of being honest and upfront about a mistake having been made in medicine but thought that it might seriously jeopardise medical practice and concluded that it "would not catch on".

== Life ==
After relocating to the Netherlands, he published a French translation of Thomas More's Utopia in 1643. He arranged for the publication of Hobbes's De Cive in Amsterdam in 1647, published a French translation in 1649, published a French translation of Hobbes' De Corpore Politico, or the Elements of Law in 1652, and helped secure a publisher for Hobbes's own Latin translation of Leviathan in 1668. His collected Lettres et discours de M. de Sorbière, sur diverses matières curieuses, published in Paris, 1660, are imbued with the spirit of compromise, reconciling science and theology and separating science from metaphysics. His life of Gassendi was prefixed to the collected edition of Gassendi's writings, 1658. Besides Gassendi and Hobbes, he corresponded with Marin Mersenne, François de La Mothe Le Vayer and other prominent thinkers of the day.

In 1663–1664, Sorbière visited England, where in 1663 he was inducted into the Royal Society. In 1664 he published an account of his stay, Relation d'un voyage en Angleterre, où sont touchées plusieurs choses, qui regardent l'estat des sciences, et de la religion (L. Billaine, Paris), in which he offered his comments on how bad the food was, how bad the inns were and imputed to the Royal Society the intention of developing a library. This provoked Thomas Sprat (then spokesman for and historian of the Society) to publish Observations upon Monsieur de Sorbier's Voyage into England (London, 1665) as a reply to Sorbière's perceived insults against both English culture and the Society in particular. In order to avoid further international controversy, Sorbière was held under arrest for four months in France, and Charles II of England prohibited any further responses.

Sorbière's conversion from Calvinism to Catholicism, which opened a career to him, has been interpreted in a political light.
