= The Elements of Law, Natural and Politic =

1640 philosophical text by Thomas Hobbes

The Elements of Law, Natural and Politic is a 1640 text by English philosopher Thomas Hobbes that includes his philosophy of human nature, language, and politics. Written and shared amid the escalating tensions of the Caroline era, its arguments and structure substantially prefigure Hobbes's later works, including De Cive and Leviathan. In 1650, Elements was bisected and published as Human Nature and De Corpore Politico, likely without Hobbes's permission.

== Background ==
The Elements of Law, Natural and Politic is a 1640 work by English philosopher Thomas Hobbes that included the first version of his political theory. Whether he considered the manuscript finished remains unclear. It was written in his own English, and this provenance has avoided other texts' problems of translating his Latin.

Elements is structured like De Cive (finished 1641, enlarged 1647) and Leviathan (finished 1651), which were revised during the English Civil War (1642–51) and Interregnum (1649–60). Hobbes formulated most of his politics and philosophy, however, before the war. Elements even addresses some points of Leviathan's political theology.

== Contents and influences ==
In Elements, Hobbes gave a concise, unified philosophical account of human nature and the passions, politics, and language.

=== Humans and language ===
Hobbes warned that "words be the signs we have of one another's opinions and intentions", and that their meaning or signification is difficult to interpret due to "the diversity of contexture" (whether textual, social–conventional, or historical), which may lead to equivocation and ambiguity. "It must be extreme hard", he wrote, "to find out the opinions and meanings of those men that are gone from us long ago, and have left us no other signification thereof but their books". He argued that meaning "cannot possibly be understood without history enough to discover those aforementioned circumstances, and also without great prudence to observe them". Linguistic philosophy was a persistent concern for him, and his work on it, including in Elements, been related to 20th-century philosophy of language.

=== Politics ===
Hobbes's political theory shows engagement with the tradition, including Aristotelian constitutional theory (which he blasted). In contrast to Aristotle's stress on state functions and social roles as part of the institutional shaping of good political order (and, later, liberal constitutionalism's legal and procedural restraints on political authority), Hobbes defended absolutism by arguing that divided political sovereignty can cause elite conflict and civil war. Though he analyzed politics methodically and structurally (through roles and institutions), he treated particular individuals as the only fundamental entities, consistent with his nominalism.

By grounding political legitimacy in voluntarist consent, after contractualist Hugo Grotius, and holding sovereignty to be necessarily absolute, after jurist–philosopher Jean Bodin, Hobbes combined voluntarist and nonvoluntarist reasoning in an apparent paradox inherited by later social contract theorists. He began Elements aiming at a universal, ahistorical contractual theory, but Parliamentarians' wins forced him to turn to the history of England, specifically the Norman Conquest (explicitly in Leviathan), to establish the sovereign's title as monarch.

== Reception ==
Elements has some polemic qualities and was passed around in a polarized war of words preceding political violence. In 1650, it was split into two publications, Human Nature and De Corpore Politico, likely without Hobbes's permission. In 1889, sociologist and philosopher Ferdinand Tönnies reconstructed the text from six available manuscripts. As of 2024, eleven manuscripts had been identified.

== See also ==
- Causality after the Middle Ages
- Conceptual history
- Corpuscularianism
- Natural law
- Reinhart Koselleck
- Semiotics
- Separation of powers
- Thought § Computationalism
