= James Heath (historian) =

English royalist historian

James Heath (c. 1629–1664?) was an English royalist historian.

== Life ==
He was a Student of Christ Church, Oxford, but deprived by Parliament. He went into exile with the future Charles II of England. On the Restoration of 1660 he was prevented from returning to his Christ Church studentship by his status as a married man, and he became a professional author.

== Writings ==
Heath's Chronicle of the Late Intestine Warr, published in 1661 and dedicated to General Monck, portrays events similar to those of the English Revolution to come. It took aim at John Milton and Marchamont Nedham, among other Parliamentarians, and depicted the course of events as a cyclical change, returning to the status quo. It was used by Thomas Hobbes as a basic source for his Behemoth.

Heath was the first biographer of Oliver Cromwell, earning himself the name “Carrion” Heath for his Flagellum (1663). John Morrill, in a 2003 article Rewriting Cromwell: a case of deafening silences, describes it as "scurrilous, mendacious, malicious"; but he commends the historical value of some additions made by an anonymous editor to the third edition, prepared after Heath's death.

Heath wrote also elegies for Thomas Fuller and the royalist bishops John Gauden and Robert Sanderson.
