= David Sosa =

American philosopher

David Sosa is an American philosopher who is currently Professor of Philosophy and Chair of the Department of Philosophy at the University of Texas, Austin. He is the editor-in-chief of the journal Analytic Philosophy.

== Career ==
He received his undergraduate degree from Brown University and a doctorate in philosophy from Princeton University. His PhD dissertation, completed in 1996 under the supervision of Mark Johnston, was titled "Representing Thoughts and Language". Before moving to Texas, Sosa was a post-doctoral fellow at U.C. Berkeley and an assistant professor of philosophy at Dartmouth College. He is the son of the philosopher Ernest Sosa.

== Views ==
Sosa appeared in Richard Linklater's film Waking Life, in which he performed a short monologue on the implications of discoveries in physics on the problem of free will. He explained the view, often called hard determinism, which holds that there is no place for free action in a world governed by physical laws since human beings, like everything else in the physical world, are physical things and are thus subject to these same laws.

== Sample publications ==
=== Authored ===
- 'Consequences of Consequentialism' (Mind, 1993)
- 'Reference from a Perspective versus Reference' (Philosophical Issues, 1995)
- 'The Import of the Puzzle About Belief' (Philosophical Review, 1996)
- 'Meaningful Explanation' (Philosophical Issues, 1997)
- 'Perception and Reason' (Philosophical Review, 1998)
- 'Getting Clear on the Concept' (Philosophical Issues, 1998)
- 'Pathetic Ethics' (Objectivity in Law and Morals, 2000)
- 'Rigidity in the Scope of Russell's Theory' (Noûs, 2001)
- 'A Big, Good Thing' (Noûs, 2004)
- 'Skepticism about Intuition' (Philosophy, 2006)
- 'Scenes Seen' (Philosophical Books, 2006)
- 'The Conditional Fallacy' (Philosophical Review, 2006) with D. Bonevac and J. Dever
- 'Rigidity' (The Oxford Handbook of Philosophy of Language, 2006)

=== Edited ===
- A Companion to Analytic Philosophy (Blackwell, 2001) with A.P. Martinich
- Analytic Philosophy: An Anthology (Blackwell, 2001)
- Philosophy for the 21st Century (Oxford, 2002)

== See also ==
- American philosophy
- List of American philosophers
