= Contemporary Philosophy of Thought =

1999 book by Michael Luntley

Contemporary Philosophy of Thought: Truth, World, Content
- Author: Michael Luntley
- Language: English
- Genre: Philosophy
- Publisher: Blackwell
- Publication date: 1999
- ISBN: 978-0631190769

Contemporary Philosophy of Thought: Truth, World, Content is a book by British philosopher Michael Luntley, published in 1999 by Blackwell. The book provides an introduction to contemporary philosophy and the issues and concepts of it. The book received reviews from journals including Mind and Philosophical Books, along with being widely cited in its field.
