= Wittgenstein: Meaning and Judgement =

2003 book by British philosopher Michael Luntley

- Author: Michael Luntley
- Publisher: Blackwell
- Publication date: 2003

Wittgenstein: Meaning and Judgement a book by British philosopher Michael Luntley, published in 2003 by Blackwell. The book provides a reading of Ludwig Wittgenstein's interpretation of the philosophical concepts of meaning and intentionality. The book received reviews from journals including Mind and Philosophical Investigations, along with being widely cited in its field.
