= Michael Luntley =

British philosopher

- Born: 1953 (age 72–73); Leamington Spa, United Kingdom

Education
- Education: University of Oxford (PhD)
- Thesis: Language and the logic of experience (1983)

Philosophical work
- Era: 21st-century philosophy
- Region: Western philosophy
- School: Analytic
- Institutions: University of Warwick
- Main interests: metaphysics of thought and reasons

Michael Luntley (born 1953) is a British philosopher and the Professor of Philosophy at the University of Warwick. He is known for his works on philosophy of thought and Wittgenstein's thought.

== Selected books ==
- Language, Logic and Experience, 1988
- The Meaning of Socialism, 1989
- Reason, Truth and Self, 1995
- Contemporary Philosophy of Thought, Blackwell, 1999
- Wittgenstein: Meaning and Judgement, Blackwell, 2003
- Wittgenstein: Opening Investigations, Wiley-Blackwell, 2015
