= Wittgenstein: Opening Investigations =

- First edition
- Author: Michael Luntley
- Publisher: Wiley-Blackwell
- Publication date: 2015

Wittgenstein: Opening Investigations is a book by British philosopher Michael Luntley, published in 2015 by Wiley-Blackwell. The book provides a reading and reframing of Ludwig Wittgenstein's Philosophical Investigations. The book received reviews from journals including Notre Dame Philosophical Reviews, Philosophy, and The Philosophical Quarterly, along with being widely cited in its field.
