= The Meaning of Socialism =

1989 book by Michael Luntley

- Title page for The Meaning of Socialism (1989)
- Author: Michael Luntley
- Language: English
- Subject: Socialism
- Genre: Non-fiction
- Publisher: Duckworth
- Publication date: 1989
- Publication place: United Kingdom

The Meaning of Socialism is a book by British philosopher Michael Luntley, published in 1989 by Duckworth and in 1990 by Open Court. The book covers the meaning and philosophy of socialism. The book received reviews from journals including Reason Papers and American Political Science Review, along with being widely cited in its field.
