= Behemoth (Hobbes book) =

1681 book by Thomas Hobbes

Behemoth, full title Behemoth: the history of the causes of the civil wars of England, and of the counsels and artifices by which they were carried on from the year 1640 to the year 1660, also known as The Long Parliament, is a book written by Thomas Hobbes discussing the English Civil War. Published posthumously in 1681, it was written in 1668, but remained unpublished at the request of Charles II of England.

== Background ==
Behemoth was written in 1668 as a follow-up to a previous and scandalous political work, Leviathan (1651). Leviathan is a representation of an ideal political world, and Behemoth has been considered to be a contrasting treatise on what happens when the very worst abuses of government come to pass. Hobbes applied his understanding of the science of human nature to explain why the English Civil War came to pass. He was able to do this because he "did not make an impassable gulf between his rational understanding on the one hand and the particular events which he witnessed, remembered, or heard about on the other". The book is written in the form of a dialogue between two men. The first speaker, called only "A", is an eyewitness and possible insider to the events of the English Civil War. The second speaker, referred to as "B", is a student aiming to understand the breakdown in the government of England at that time.

Hobbes was refused permission by King Charles II to publish Behemoth. While the king recognised the correctness of the account of events and issues, he was concerned that the book would not be well received. Charles withheld his permission to publish, in the hope that Hobbes would avoid further scandal, and perhaps see his reputation as a thinker restored.

The manuscript for Behemoth was pirated and printed in unauthorised editions in Europe during the 1670s and in a letter to his friend John Aubrey, Hobbes stated his disappointment with this turn of events. An official edition was released, three years after Hobbes' death in 1679, by his literary agent William Crooke. According to Aloysius Martinich, "after its initial success the book was relatively unread and unstudied until there was a resurgence of interest in it in the last quarter of the twentieth century".

Behemoth is not entirely factual, accurate or literal in retelling of the events of the English Civil War but still has value for students of the history of thought or revolution. As Royce MacGillivray puts it:

"It is noteworthy, however, for the brilliance of the interpretation, the excellence of the prose, the revelation of what it was possible for a profoundly rationalist thinker to conclude about the religious issues of the war, and the interest of seeing this daring and powerful thinker, more fully than he had done elsewhere, apply his philosophy to the state of the catastrophe of the war."

Hobbes instead is drawing on his memories of the events and on two other possible sources, both written by James Heath around 1663. These are A Brief Chronicle of all the Chief Actions and the expanded A Brief Chronicle of the Late Intestine Warr. It is possible they were simply used as prompts for Hobbes, already 80 years old when he wrote Behemoth. According to MacGillivray very little material from these sources found its way directly into the text.

The summation below is just that, a summation, and is only the most basic part of each section. No effort is made to correct any inconsistencies introduced into the discussion between the master and the student so that the information may be presented as it was written by Thomas Hobbes.

== Preface: The Bookseller to the reader ==
The 1682 edition of the book begins with a note from William Crooke in answer to why he was publishing this edition. Hobbes had made Crooke the caretaker of his literary estate in July 1679. Crooke knew of the editions of Behemoth published in Europe and he reasoned that these editions did not show the work in the best possible light due to the many textual errors and omissions. It would therefore be best to publish an authorized edition to correct these errors and show the work as Hobbes wanted it to be read. Crooke had as his source a manuscript copy of the text given to him by Thomas Hobbes around 1670.

== Part One: Behemoth, or the Epitome of the Civil Wars of England ==
This is the longest section of the book and roughly covers the period 1640–1642.

The dialogue opens with the student asking the master how it was that a monarch as strong as Charles I of England should ever have had to face a rebellion. The master relates that a growing opposition to the crown was promoted by seven factions, each of them for their own ends and not in concert, who stoked the fires of rebellion. These factions were: Papists, Presbyterians, Independents including other sects of religious faith, those who were corrupted by their reading of the Latin and Greek classics, centres of commerce and trade such as London, those with no means of support who saw the war as a way to profit, and the lack of understanding as to the important role played by the monarchy in society.

The motivations of each of these groups and how they contributed to the Civil War is discussed by the master and the student throughout the first part of the book. This section has been considered anti-clerical in its leanings as none of the actions of the religious groups involved are shown in any sort of positive light.

The Papists wanted to condemn any ruler who did not offer compliance to the will of Rome. As Charles I was officially a Protestant, this was not popular. There were not many Papists in England at this time but they still had a voice that could be heard by their own adherents.

Presbyterian ministers did not like a king whose queen was a known and practising Catholic. This translated itself into speeches calling for the exile of the queen and other Papists. As Catholicism was already severely proscribed against in the late 17th century these calls for expulsion are not unexpected or difficult to understand.

The Independents and the other sects of the Protestant reformation were advocates of liberty and freedom in certain instances especially in the matter of religious choice. Provided an individual did not want to follow the Roman church their religious views would be tolerated by most of the Protestant groups.

The issue of an absolute monarchy was a crucial cause of the Civil War according to Hobbes. Many members of the House of Parliament who wanted a monarchy did not want it to be an absolute one. Instead they desired that it act in consultation with the house before taking action. Charles I did not see the powers of the crown as being answerable to any but God. Parliament then acted to withhold required funds from the King in his quest to defeat the rebellious Scots. The Scots, Hobbes tells us, were in arms over the practice of episcopacy. This weakened the power of the crown but Charles I drew on the nobility to supply the needed funds for the war. When this source ran out Charles turned to Parliament to raise the Ship Money, a percentage of customs revenue given to the King for the upkeep of the navy, so that he could use these funds to continue the war against the Scots. Parliament declared that illegal and took the crown to court over the issue.

The universities are brought into the discussion at this point. They existed as places where one could learn the classics and supposedly sharpen their minds by doing so. Instead they did not have the wit to read the classics critically and took them at their face value. This translated into certain scholars advocating an idealised form of republic to their students. However they did not teach the many virtues of the monarch to their students who came to see the crown as irresponsible.

Hobbes reminds his student that obedience is all that is required to live a good and peaceful life. This obedience should extend to the crown as it does to God and one's parents but this is not what was preached by the Protestant clergy. Instead they advised disobedience of royal edicts such as the raising privately of funds for the king's use. When this directive for disobedience was coupled with the teachings of ancient rebellions as a way to remove so called despotic domains it left a fertile ground for revolution in England.

== Part Two: Both Sides Prepare for War ==
The second section picks up the conversation on the following day and discusses how those who sought rebellion now began to make preparations for it to come to pass.

The people of England had become accustomed to hear from those whom they trusted, namely the bishops and the members of Parliament, how corrupted the crown had become. Now the discussion turned to a supposed plot by the King and Queen to return the realm to the church of Rome. The king responded by banishing some who had written pamphlets and sermons suggesting this return to Catholicism. Parliament had three of them released and they were received triumphantly in London upon their return.

In an effort to further weaken the King, Parliament sought to have removed those members who were supporters of the monarchy. To this end the house impeached the Lord of Strafford for treason to Parliament and had him beheaded. Next Parliament arrested and executed the Archbishop of Canterbury for his preaching of the introduction of arbitrary government ruled in consultation of the bishops. This was opposed by many in Parliament, but mainly by the Scots.

After this discussion Hobbes' master provides a history of the house of commons and its role in the governance of the realm. He reminds his student that the Parliament had always been an institution of counsel and not control over the monarchy. The present Parliament oversteps the ancient bounds imposed on it by its appointed role as representative of the people before the king.

The rising in Ireland of an army of Papist sympathies who busied themselves harassing and slaughtering Protestants becomes an issue before the Parliament. A truce is made with the king to arrange a militia to combat this uprising in Ireland. Charles I dismissed the charges of high treason but would not identify his informant in the commons. The solicitor general is accused of being an informer on the house and he flees to France to avoid the wrath of the Parliament.

Parliament next took control of the militia from the crown and insisted that no adherents of the Roman church be allowed to command the army being sent to Ireland. Parliament raised funds for this expedition by selling shares of land in the Irish province of Ulster. A small share, three pence on every acre, was reserved for the crown with the balance of the funds being set aside for Parliament. The king did not assent to this. Relations between the two sides once again broke down and the king issued a declaration that Parliament needed to be obedient to the established laws of the kingdom.

Both sides began to gather material and men for possible war. The Parliament sent a message to the king, a humble petition, with 19 propositions to prevent conflict. The nineteen points are:

1. Ministers serving on the King's Privy Council must be approved by the House of Commons and Lords.
2. Matters that concern the public must be debated only by Parliament.
3. A number of high offices, those dealing with finances and laws of the kingdom, must be chosen with the consent of both houses of Parliament.
4. The King's children's education and raising should be committed to those approved of by Parliament.
5. Parliament shall approve of the marriage of the King's children to any person, from home or abroad.
6. All laws against Papists must be strictly enforced.
7. The vote of Papists in the Lords shall be taken away, and the children of Papists must receive a Protestant education.
8. A reformation of the Church government must be made in a manner advised by both houses.
9. The King will accept the ordering of the militia by Parliament.
10. Members of Parliament that have recently been removed from the house must be allowed to return.
11. Councilors and judges must take an oath to maintain certain Parliamentary statutes.
12. All judges and officers approved of by Parliament shall hold their posts on condition of good behaviour.
13. The justice of Parliament shall apply to all law-breakers, whether they are inside the country or have fled.
14. The King's pardon must be granted, unless both houses of Parliament object.
15. Parliament must approve the King's appointees for commanders of the forts and castles of the kingdom.
16. The unnecessary military attachment guarding the King must be discharged.
17. The Kingdom will formalise its alliance with the Protestant States of the United Provinces (the Dutch) to defend them against the Pope and his followers.
18. The King must clear the six members of Parliament of any wrongdoing.
19. New peers of the House of Lords must be voted in by both Houses of Parliament.

These nineteen points were rejected by the king as they would further weaken the authority of the crown. This left both Parliament and the king no choice but to go to war.

See the related article Nineteen Propositions for a further discussion of this aspect of the English Civil War.

== Part Three: The English Civil War, Rise of Cromwell, and Execution of Charles I ==
The discussion again continues after a break and now turns to the matter of the Civil war itself. The student is concerned about what he sees as the inability of Charles I to stand up to the Parliament due to his overall lack of resources as Parliament has taken control of much of the necessary material to fight a war. The master reminds the student that the officers on the side of the crown were all well experienced men and that this was an advantage that the Parliamentarians did not have. As for money, neither side had much on hand. Some of the forces supporting the king took future credit while those supporting the Parliament were funded by an appeal to the cities and by the placing of levies on the towns.

As the wars continued men on both sides of the struggle changed sides. This at first was to the detriment of the Parliamentary forces but in time some of those loyal to the king began to support the cause of the Parliament. This was despite the king's ancient right to call for arms in times of conflict from all land owners and high born people. The Parliamentarians had already abandoned most of the laws and so this most ancient call to arms for the king was largely ignored.

The progress of the wars showed that early on the victory was mainly had by the king's cavaliers over Parliament's forces. Mainly in the north and the west of the country Charles I had his successes. Scotland came into the war on the side of Parliament and this put some pressure on the crown's forces. This pressure was used by Oliver Cromwell in 1644 to win the Battle of Marston Moor. This marks the rise of Oliver Cromwell in the Parliamentary army and he would use these successes to eventually take over the control of the commonwealth as Lord Protector.

In 1645 Cromwell reorganised Parliament's forces into the New Model Army. This was a more disciplined and better trained group of soldiers and with this the tide began to turn against the royalist cause. In 1646 the besieged Charles I received from Parliament the same nineteen points that had brought both sides to conflict. Charles again did not give assent to them. Instead an arrangement was brokered between Parliament and the king that would see him surrender himself to them and thus end the war. By the end of 1646 the great seal of the king was broken and power over England was now available to be taken.

1647 and 1648 saw the contention for control over the realm between Oliver Cromwell, with his New Model Army, and the Parliament as the king was held prisoner and not permitted to govern. Cromwell controlled 55 members of the parliament and used them to gain further support for his control over the government. Cromwell made overtures to the king to gain those members who had supported the royalist cause. London tried to stand against Cromwell but was quickly put down. He continued to consolidate his power and eventually had control over the parliament. He did not turn control back to the king as he said he would.

Charles I was as unwilling to work with Parliament under the control of Cromwell and the generals as he had been before the Civil War. Cromwell removed opposition in the house, leaving what became known as the Rump Parliament, and began a charge against the king for his part in bringing about the war.

The king was brought before Parliament, the charges read, and the king denied the authority of Parliament to charge him. This occurred three times and each time Parliament asserted that they did have the necessary authority. Charles was found guilty of tyranny and executed at the gates of Whitehall on 30 January 1649.

== Part Four: The Protectorship of Oliver Cromwell, Failure of Richard Cromwell, Restoration of the Stuarts ==
The Rump Parliament became an Oligarchy after the execution of Charles I. A forty-person council of state, whose job was to carry out the directives of the Rump Parliament, was established. The Parliament took the name Custodes Libertatis Angliae (Custodians of English Liberty) for use in legal matters. Hobbes saw this as being foolish as they did not have a good idea of what liberty actually meant.

Cromwell, not yet the sole head of the government, went with the army to Ireland and in a year subdued the entire country. In Scotland the Earl of Montrose failed to get the people behind a rising against the Parliament and was executed. Cromwell's rival, General Fairfax, resigned instead of taking an army into Scotland to fight fellow Presbyterians. Cromwell was now made general of the entire army.

Charles II went to Scotland, after agreeing to the demands of the Scots Parliament and sat as king. Hostilities between England and Scotland recommenced. Cromwell and the army invaded Scotland to capture the young king. Charles II, after failing to hold Edinburgh or Stirling, was able to escape to the Continent.

The Rump responded to an altercation with the Dutch and it began the First Anglo–Dutch War in 1652. Cromwell continued to fight the enemies of England while he solidified his hold over the Parliament. Cromwell was able to dissolve Parliament on 23 April 1653. A new parliament was composed of 142 of Cromwell's staunchest supporters from the army and the old Parliament. He gave them supreme power, and they in return appointed him Protector of England. The Dutch were defeated by the English, and Cromwell now had control of all of England.

In 1657 Cromwell was offered the title of king but refused it due to the opposition of the army, his source of power, to the idea. Parliament began to descend into disorder as factionalism again crept into its proceedings. Cromwell managed to keep the various factions in line.

After Cromwell's death the Parliament fell into disarray. General Monck saw that the only solution to the troubles was not to have Richard Cromwell succeed his father but to restore the monarchy. Monck occupied London with the army and forced parliament to offer the crown to Charles II. The monarchy was then restored when Charles II accepted the offer of the Parliament.

== Criticism of Hobbes' views on rebellion ==
Immanuel Kant, one of the leading intellects of the Age of Enlightenment, had a different view on the nature of rebellions from Hobbes. Howard Williams, of the University of Wales, in 2003 wrote a study comparing the views of the two great thinkers on the subject of revolution amongst other things. Hobbes saw all revolution as something that should be avoided at all costs. Hobbes expressed society as a combination of the people, as the body of the society, and the monarchy, as the soul of the society, making a healthy commonwealth. Without the soul the body dies and so it is with society for Hobbes. Civil war should be avoided because it is "the process of a society losing its soul". Williams describes Hobbes as writing Behemoth to "capture the spirit of those awful times and to suggest emphatically that they should not be repeated". Hobbes did not believe that anything positive came out of the civil war.

Kant, according to Williams, shares the same basic attitude to the resistance of sovereign power but does not think that all outcomes of Rebellion are necessarily negative. Kant is writing about the French Revolution, not the English Civil War, in his book The Conflict of the Faculties. Written more than 100 years after Hobbes wrote Behemoth, it has as its focus the idea that rebellions arouse sympathy in other countries for the people caught up in them. Kant says that this is due to a "moral disposition within the human race". Going further Kant, according to Williams, implies that uprisings are the wrong solution to a problem with governance but that there can still be something positive in the results of that uprising.

Hobbes does not think that there is any sort of innate morality in society and that rebellion is either "an unwise or failed experiment as a complete blunder arising from ignorance". Instead, according to Williams, Hobbes has sympathy not for the common people caught up in the rebellion but instead for those who were the victims of the rebellion. This is in keeping with the royalist stance taken by Hobbes in Behemoth.

The French Revolution was not the only source for Kant's views on rebellion. He took into account the American Revolutionary War and the English Civil war as well as the views of classical thinking on the nature of republics. Hobbes, of course, could not do this. Kant as well was more of an observer than a participant in the events of these revolutions. Hobbes was deeply affected by the Civil war and believed that rebellion would not be a solution. Instead "only an absolute sovereign power could teach 'the science of just and unjust', fixing meanings in a stable way and thus inducing social cohesion".

Hobbes then is a supporter of an "absolute sovereignty, embodied in a monarch or corporate body of individuals; Kant is a supporter of popular sovereignty, embodied in the law-making powers of a group of the people's representatives". Another key difference between the two philosophers is the way that the laws of the land should be administered. An absolute monarch, for Hobbes, implies that the authority of that monarch "must be beyond question, whereas for Kant the sovereign's authority is best safeguarded through the possibility of public debate and criticism". These fundamental differences in thinking are perhaps more to do with the differences in the eras the two philosophers lived in. Hobbes lived a hundred years before Kant. Additionally Hobbes experienced rebellion first hand, even to the point of fleeing England for fear of his personal safety, whereas Kant did not directly suffer during the rebellions that occurred in his lifetime. Another consideration was that in the course of a century much more had been written on the subject of the rights of the people and of liberty and this too must have been an influence on Kant's point of view. This does not negate Hobbes' views on rebellion but does illuminate a probable cause for his position on them.
