= Bellum omnium contra omnes =

Latin phrase coined by Thomas Hobbes

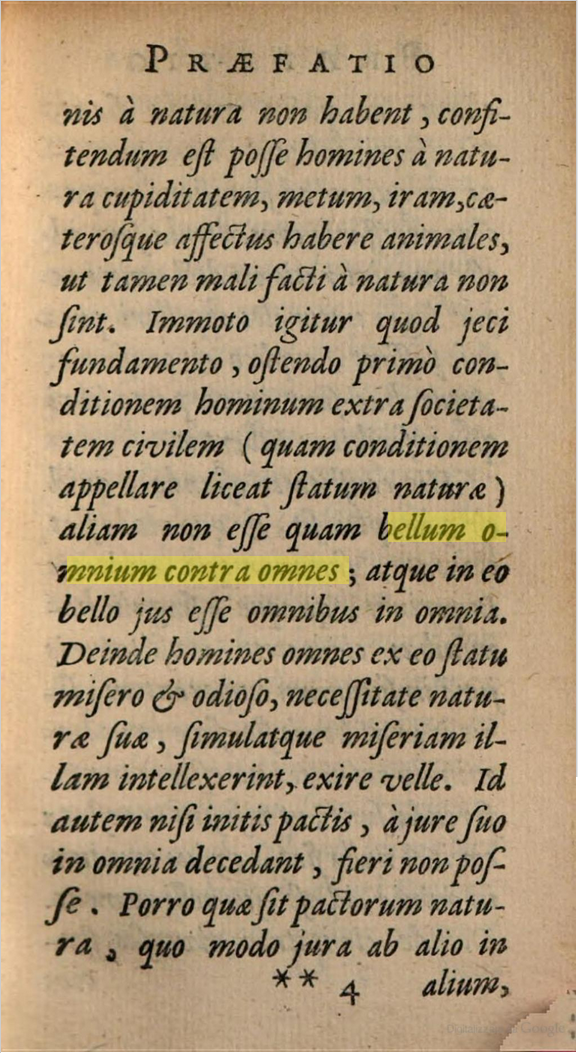
The Præfatio (Preface) of De Cive where the phrase bellum omnium contra omnes appears for the first time. Taken from the revised edition printed in 1647 at Amsterdam (apud L. Elzevirium).

Bellum omnium contra omnes, a Latin phrase meaning "the war of all against all", is the description that Thomas Hobbes gives to human existence in the state-of-nature thought experiment that he conducts in De Cive (1642) and Leviathan (1651). The common modern English usage is a war of "each against all" where war is rare and terms such as "competition" or "struggle" are more common.

== Thomas Hobbes' use ==
In Leviathan itself, Hobbes speaks of 'warre of every one against every one', of 'a war [...] of every man against every man' and of 'a perpetuall warre of every man against his neighbour', but the Latin phrase occurs in De Cive:

[...] ostendo primo conditionem hominum extra societatem civilem, quam conditionem appellare liceat statum naturæ, aliam non esse quam bellum omnium contra omnes; atque in eo bello jus esse omnibus in omnia. (I demonstrate, in the first place, that the state of men without civil society (which state we may properly call the state of nature) is nothing else but a mere war of all against all; and in that war all men have equal right unto all things.)

Later on, two slightly modified versions are presented in De Cive:

[...] Status hominum naturalis antequam in societatem coiretur, bellum fuerit; neque hoc simpliciter, sed bellum omnium in omnes. (The natural state of men, before they entered into society, was a mere war, and that not simply, but a war of all men against all men.)

Nam unusquisque naturali necessitate bonum sibi appetit, neque est quisquam qui bellum istud omnium contra omnes, quod tali statui naturaliter adhæret, sibi existimat esse bonum. (For every man by natural necessity desires that which is good for him: nor is there any that esteems a war of all against all, which necessarily adheres to such a state, to be good for him.)

In chapter XIII of Leviathan, Hobbes explains the concept with these words:

Hereby it is manifest that during the time men live without a common Power to keep them all in awe, they are in that condition which is called War; and such a war as is of every man against every man. [...] In such condition there is no place for Industry, because the fruit thereof is uncertain: and consequently no Culture of the Earth; no Navigation, nor use of the commodities that may be imported by Sea; no commodious Building; no Instruments of moving and removing such things as require much force; no Knowledge of the face of the Earth; no account of Time; no Arts; no Letters; no Society; and which is worst of all, continual Fear, and danger of violent death; And the life of man solitary, poor, nasty, brutish, and short.

The thought experiment places people in a pre-social condition, and theorizes what would happen in such a condition. According to Hobbes, the outcome is that people choose to enter a social contract, giving up some of their liberties in order to enjoy peace. This thought experiment is a test for the legitimation of a state in fulfilling its role as "sovereign" to guarantee social order, and for comparing different types of states on that basis.

Hobbes distinguishes between war and battle: war does not only consist of actual battle; it points to the situation in which one knows there is a 'Will to contend by Battle'.

== Later uses ==
In his Notes on the State of Virginia (1785), Thomas Jefferson uses the phrase bellum omnium in omnia ("war of all things against all things", assuming omnium is intended to be neuter like omnia) as he laments that the constitution of that state was twice at risk of being sacrificed to the nomination of a dictator after the manner of the Roman Republic.

The phrase was sometimes used by Karl Marx and Friedrich Engels:

- In On the Jewish Question (1843–1844):

Religion has become the spirit of civil society, of the sphere of egoism, of bellum omnium contra omnes.

- In Outlines of the Critique of Political Economy (1857–1858):

One could just as well deduce from this abstract phrase that each individual reciprocally blocks the assertion of the others' interests, so that, instead of a general affirmation this war of all against all produces a general negation.

The English translation eliminates the Latin phrase used in the original German.

- In a letter from Marx to Engels (18 June 1862):

It is remarkable how Darwin rediscovers, among the beasts and plants, the society of England with its division of labour, competition, opening up of new markets, 'inventions' and Malthusian 'struggle for existence'. It is Hobbes' bellum omnium contra omnes.

- In a letter to Pyotr Lavrov (London, 12–17 November 1875), Engels is expressed clearly against any attempt to legitimize the trend anthropomorphizing human nature to the distorted view of natural selection:

The whole Darwinists teaching of the struggle for existence is simply a transference from society to living nature of Hobbes's doctrine of bellum omnium contra omnes and of the bourgeois-economic doctrine of competition together with Malthus's theory of population. When this conjurer's trick has been performed..., the same theories are transferred back again from organic nature into history and it is now claimed that their validity as eternal laws of human society has been proved.

- It was also used by Friedrich Nietzsche in On Truth and Lies in a Nonmoral Sense (1873):

Insofar as the individual wants to preserve himself against other individuals, in a natural state of affairs he employs the intellect mostly for simulation alone. But because man, out of need and boredom, wants to exist socially, herd-fashion, he requires a peace pact and he endeavors to banish at least the very crudest bellum omnium contra omnes from his world.

- Max Stirner used the term in his book The Ego and Its Own (1844).
- Rudolf Steiner describes it with the term "war of all against all" that will happen during a future epoch, when the human race will be submitted to a powerful selfishness.

== See also ==
- Anomie
- Failed state
- Homo homini lupus
- List of Latin phrases
- Rat race
- Social contract theories
- State of nature
