= De Corpore =

1655 book by Thomas Hobbes

De Corpore ("On the Body") is a 1655 book by the English philosopher Thomas Hobbes. As its full Latin title Elementorum philosophiae sectio prima De corpore implies, it was part of a larger work, conceived as a trilogy. De Cive had already appeared, while De Homine would be published in 1658. Hobbes had in fact been drafting De Corpore for at least ten years before its appearance, putting it aside for other matters. This delay affected its reception: the approach taken seemed much less innovative than it would have done in the previous decade.

The first part covers logic, while the second covers various scientific concepts. The third part covers primarily geometry, with a number of chapters devoted to mathematics and kinematics. The fourth part covers physics. In 1656, Hobbes himself supervised the first English translation of the work. A planned French translation was never completed.

== Contents ==
Although the chosen title would suggest a work of natural philosophy, De Corpore is largely devoted to foundational matters. It consists of four sections. Part I covers logic. Part II and Part III concern “abstract bodies”: the second part is a repertoire of scientific concepts, and the third of geometry. The Chapters 16 to 20 of Part III are in fact devoted to mathematics generally, in a reductive way, and proved controversial. They proposed a kinematic foundation for geometry, which Hobbes wished to equate with mathematics; geometry itself, that is, is a “science of motion”. Hobbes here adopts ideas from Galileo Galilei and Bonaventura Cavalieri. It is in Part IV, on natural phenomena, that there is discussion of physics as such.

== Scope ==
Hobbes in De Corpore states that the subject of philosophy is devoted to "bodies". He clarifies this by division: in English translation, natural philosophy is concerned with concept of "natural body" (Latin: corpus naturale), while the bodies called commonwealths are the concern of "civil philosophy". He then applies "body" as synonymous with substance, breaking with the scholastic tradition.

== Mathematical errors ==
Some proofs in the work being "botched", as Noel Malcolm puts it, De Corpore had a negative effect on Hobbes's scholarly reputation. The inclusion of a claimed solution for squaring the circle, an apparent afterthought rather than a systematic development, led to an extended pamphlet war in the Hobbes-Wallis controversy.

== Editions and translations ==
Hobbes supervised an English translation of De Corpore, which was published in 1656. There were some changes, and a provocative appendix Six Lessons to the Professors of Mathematics was added. It has been claimed that the translation was vitiated by errors, undermining its usefulness as a guide to Hobbes's philosophy of language. A planned French translation was made, but never appeared, probably because of further revision plans. No revised edition appeared until 1668, when De Corpore was included in the Opera philosophica collection of Hobbes' works.

A modern translation of the first part of De Corpore is available: Thomas Hobbes, Computatio sive logica: Logic, Latin text, translation and commentary by Aloysius Martinich; edited, and with an introductory essay, by Isabel C. Hungerland and George R. Vick, New York: Abaris Books, 1981.

Critical edition of the Latin text: Thomas Hobbes, De Corpore, edited with Introduction and notes (in French) by Karl Schuhmann, Paris: Vrin, 1999.

== See also ==
- Thought § Computationalism
