= Procedure =

Procedure may refer to:

- Medical procedure
- Instructions or recipes, a set of commands that show how to achieve some result, such as to prepare or make something
- Procedure (business), specifying parts of a business process
- Standard operating procedure, a step-by-step instruction to achieve some result, used in industry and military
- Legal procedure, the body of law and rules used in the administration of justice in the court system, including:
  - Civil procedure
  - Criminal procedure
  - Administrative procedure
- Parliamentary procedure, a set of rules governing meetings
- Procedure (computer science), also termed a subroutine, function, or subprogram
  - Stored procedure, a subroutine in the data dictionary of a relational database
- The Procedure, an American hardcore band
