= Thomas Hobbes =

English philosopher and political theorist (1588–1679)

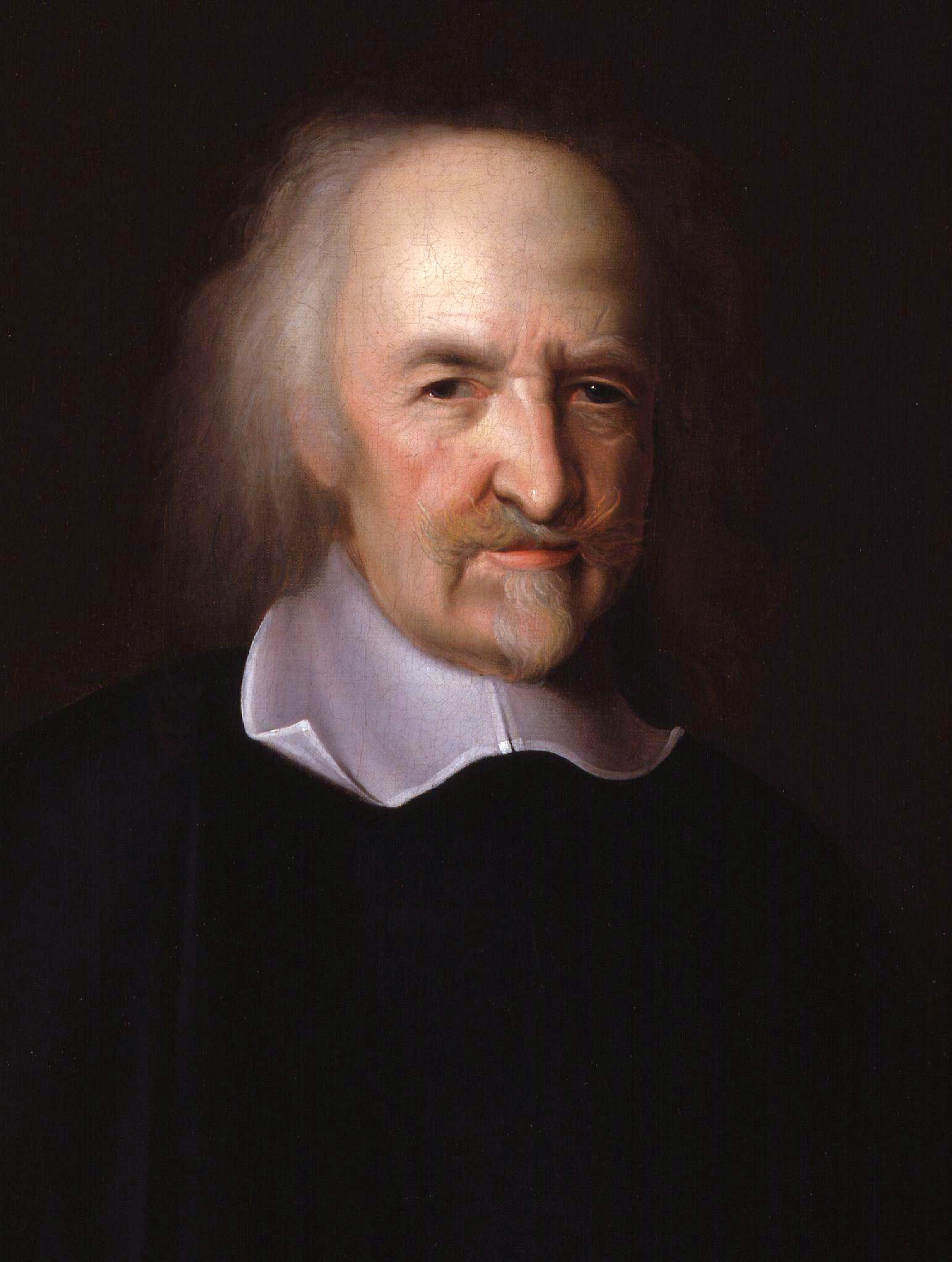
- Portrait by John Michael Wright, c. 1669–70
- Born: 5 April 1588; Westport, Wiltshire, England
- Died: 4 December 1679 (aged 91); Ault Hucknall, Derbyshire, England

Education
- Education: Magdalen Hall, Oxford; St John's College, Cambridge (BA)

Philosophical work
- Era: 17th-century philosophy
- Region: Western philosophy
- School: British empiricism; Classical realism; Corpuscularianism; Descriptive egoism; Determinism; English Renaissance; Materialism; Legal positivism; Natural law; Nominalism; Social contract
- Main interests: Political philosophy; history; ethics; geometry
- Notable works: De Cive (1647); Leviathan (1651); De Corpore (1655); Behemoth (1681)
- Notable ideas: Social contract; State of nature; Bellum omnium contra omnes

Signature
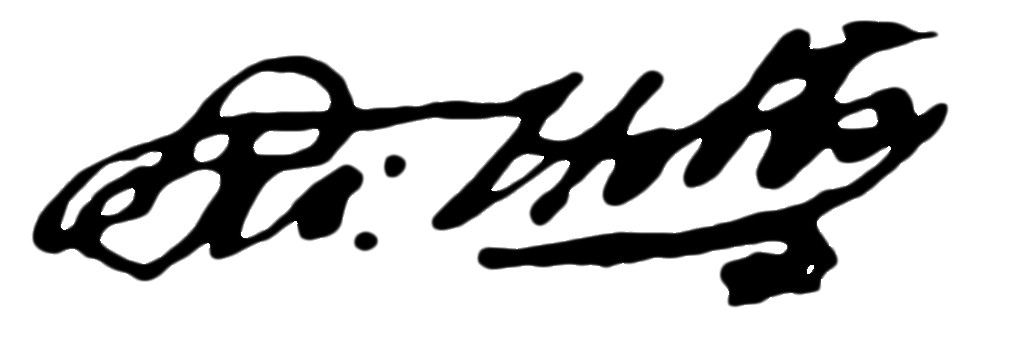

Thomas Hobbes (/hɒbz/ HOBZ; 5 April 1588 – 4 December 1679) (Note: 15 April [O.S. 5 April] 1588 – 14 December [O.S. 4 December] 1679) was an English philosopher and political theorist, best known for his 1651 book Leviathan, in which he expounds an influential formulation of social contract theory. He is considered to be one of the founders of modern political philosophy.

In his early life, overshadowed by his father's departure following a fight, he was taken under the care of his wealthy uncle. Hobbes's academic journey began in Westport, leading him to the University of Oxford, where he was exposed to classical literature and mathematics. He then graduated from the University of Cambridge in 1608. He became a tutor to the Cavendish family, which connected him to intellectual circles and initiated his extensive travels across Europe. These experiences, including meetings with figures like Galileo, shaped his intellectual development.

After returning to England from France in 1637, Hobbes witnessed the destruction and brutality of the English Civil War from 1642 to 1651 between Parliamentarians and Royalists, which heavily influenced his advocacy for governance by an absolute sovereign in Leviathan, as the solution to human conflict and societal breakdown. Aside from social contract theory, Leviathan also popularised ideas such as the state of nature ("war of all against all") and laws of nature. His other major works include the trilogy De Cive (1642), De Corpore (1655), and De Homine (1658) as well as the posthumous work Behemoth (1681).

Hobbes contributed to a diverse array of fields, including history, jurisprudence, geometry, optics, theology, classical translations, ethics, as well as philosophy in general, marking him as a polymath. Despite controversies and challenges to his reputation, including accusations of atheism and contentious debates with contemporaries, Hobbes's work profoundly influenced the understanding of political structure and human nature.

== Biography ==
=== Early life ===
Thomas Hobbes was born on 5 April 1588 (Old Style), in Westport, now part of Malmesbury in Wiltshire, England. Having been born prematurely when his mother heard of the coming invasion of the Spanish Armada, Hobbes later reported that "my mother gave birth to twins: myself and fear." Hobbes had a brother, Edmund, about two years older, as well as a sister, Anne.

Although Thomas Hobbes's childhood is unknown to a large extent, as is his mother's name, it is known that Hobbes's father, Thomas Sr., was the vicar of both Charlton and Westport. Hobbes's father was uneducated, according to John Aubrey, Hobbes's biographer, and he "disesteemed learning." Thomas Sr. was involved in a fight with the local clergy outside his church, forcing him to leave London. As a result, the family was left in the care of Thomas Sr.'s older brother, Francis, a wealthy glove manufacturer with no family of his own.

==== Education ====
Hobbes was educated at Westport church from age four, went to the Malmesbury school, and then to a private school kept by a young man named Robert Latimer, a graduate of the University of Oxford. Hobbes was a good pupil, and between 1601 and 1602 he went to Magdalen Hall, the predecessor to Hertford College, Oxford, where he was taught scholastic logic and mathematics. The principal, John Wilkinson, was a Puritan and had some influence on Hobbes. Before going up to Oxford, Hobbes translated Euripides's Medea from Greek into Latin verse.

At university, Thomas Hobbes appears to have followed his own curriculum as he was little attracted by the scholastic learning. Leaving Oxford, Hobbes completed his B.A. degree by incorporation at St John's College, Cambridge, in 1608. He was recommended by Sir James Hussey, his master at Magdalen, as tutor to William, the son of William Cavendish, Baron of Hardwick (and later Earl of Devonshire), and began a lifelong connection with that family. William Cavendish was elevated to the peerage on his father's death in 1626, holding it for two years before his death in 1628. His son, also William, likewise became the 3rd Earl of Devonshire. Hobbes served as a tutor and secretary to both men. The 1st Earl's younger brother, Charles Cavendish, had two sons who were patrons of Hobbes. The elder son, William Cavendish, later 1st Duke of Newcastle, was a leading supporter of Charles I during the Civil War in which he personally financed an army for the king, having been governor to the Prince of Wales, Charles James, Duke of Cornwall. It was to this William Cavendish that Hobbes dedicated his Elements of Law.

Hobbes became a companion to the younger William Cavendish, and they both took part in a grand tour of Europe between 1610 and 1615. Hobbes was exposed to European scientific and critical methods during the tour, in contrast to the scholastic philosophy that he had learned in Oxford. In Venice, Hobbes made the acquaintance of Fulgenzio Micanzio, an associate of Paolo Sarpi, a Venetian scholar and statesman.

His scholarly efforts at the time were aimed at a careful study of classical Greek and Latin authors, the outcome of which was, in 1628, his edition of Thucydides's History of the Peloponnesian War, the first translation of that work into English directly from a Greek manuscript. Hobbes professed a deep admiration for Thucydides, praising him as "the most politic historiographer that ever writ," and one scholar has suggested that "Hobbes' reading of Thucydides confirmed, or perhaps crystallized, the broad outlines and many of the details of [Hobbes's] own thought." It has been argued that three of the discourses in the 1620 publication known as Horae Subsecivae: Observations and Discourses also represent the work of Hobbes from this period.

Although he did associate with literary figures like Ben Jonson and briefly worked as Francis Bacon's amanuensis, translating several of his Essays into Latin, he did not extend his efforts into philosophy until after 1629. In June 1628, his employer Cavendish, then the Earl of Devonshire, died of the plague, and his widow, the countess Christian, dismissed Hobbes.

=== Paris (1629–1637) ===
In 1629, Hobbes found work as a tutor to Gervase Clifton, the son of Sir Gervase Clifton, 1st Baronet, and continued in this role until November 1630. He spent most of this time in Paris. Thereafter, he again found work with the Cavendish family, tutoring William Cavendish, 3rd Earl of Devonshire, the eldest son of his previous pupil. Over the next seven years, as well as tutoring, he expanded his own knowledge of philosophy, awakening in him curiosity over key philosophical debates. He visited Galileo Galilei in Florence while he was under house arrest upon condemnation, in 1636, and was later a regular debater in philosophic groups in Paris, held together by Marin Mersenne.

Hobbes's first area of study was an interest in the physical doctrine of motion and physical momentum. Despite his interest in this phenomenon, he disdained experimental work as in physics. He went on to conceive the system of thought to the elaboration of which he would devote his life. His scheme was first to work out, in a separate treatise, a systematic doctrine of body, showing how physical phenomena were universally explicable in terms of motion, at least as motion or mechanical action was then understood. He then singled out Man from the realm of Nature and plants. Then, in another treatise, he showed what specific bodily motions were involved in the production of the peculiar phenomena of sensation, knowledge, affections and passions whereby Man came into relation with Man. Finally, he considered, in his crowning treatise, how Men were moved to enter into society, and argued how this must be regulated if people were not to fall back into "brutishness and misery". Thus, he proposed to unite the separate phenomena of Body, Man, and the State.

=== England (1637–1641) ===
Hobbes came back home from Paris in 1637, to a country riven with discontent, which disrupted him from the orderly execution of his philosophic plan. However, by the end of the Short Parliament in 1640, he had written a short treatise called The Elements of Law, Natural and Politic. It was not published and only circulated as a manuscript among his acquaintances. A pirated version, however, was published about ten years later. Although it seems that much of The Elements of Law was composed before the sitting of the Short Parliament, there are polemical pieces of the work that clearly mark the influences of the rising political crisis. Nevertheless, many (though not all) elements of Hobbes's political thought were unchanged between The Elements of Law and Leviathan, which demonstrates that the events of the English Civil War had little effect on his contractarian methodology. However, the arguments in Leviathan were modified from The Elements of Law when it came to the necessity of consent in creating political obligation: Hobbes wrote in The Elements of Law that patrimonial kingdoms were not necessarily formed by the consent of the governed, while in Leviathan he argued that they were. This was perhaps a reflection either of Hobbes's thoughts about the engagement controversy or of his reaction to treatises published by Patriarchalists, such as Sir Robert Filmer, between 1640 and 1651.

When in November 1640 the Long Parliament succeeded the Short, Hobbes felt that he was in disfavour due to the circulation of his treatise and fled to Paris. He did not return for 11 years. In Paris, he rejoined the coterie around Mersenne and wrote a critique of the Meditations on First Philosophy of René Descartes, which was printed as third among the sets of "Objections" appended, with "Replies" from Descartes, in 1641. A different set of remarks on other works by Descartes succeeded only in ending all correspondence between the two.

Hobbes also extended his own works in a way, working on the third section, De Cive, which was finished in November 1641. Although it was initially only circulated privately, it was well received and included lines of argumentation that were repeated a decade later in Leviathan. He then returned to hard work on the first two sections of his work and published little except a short treatise on optics (Tractatus opticus), included in the collection of scientific tracts published by Mersenne as Cogitata physico-mathematica in 1644. He built a good reputation in philosophic circles and in 1645 was chosen with Descartes, Gilles de Roberval, and others to referee the controversy between John Pell and Longomontanus over the problem of squaring the circle.

=== Civil War period (1642–1651) ===
The English Civil War began in August 1642, and when the royalist cause began to decline in mid-1644, many royalists came to Paris and were known to Hobbes. This revitalised Hobbes's political interests, and the De Cive was republished and more widely distributed. The printing began in 1646 by Samuel de Sorbiere through the Elsevier press in Amsterdam with a new preface and some new notes in reply to objections.

In 1647, Hobbes took up a position as mathematical instructor to the young Charles, Prince of Wales, who had come to Paris from Jersey around July. This engagement lasted until 1648, when Charles went to Holland.

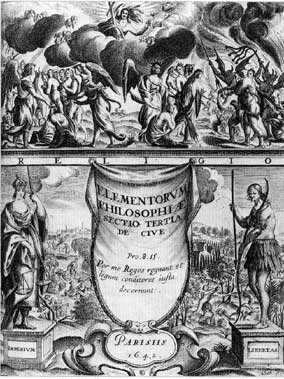
Frontispiece from De Cive (1642)

The company of the exiled royalists led Hobbes to produce Leviathan, which set forth his theory of civil government in relation to the political crisis resulting from the war. Hobbes compared the State to a monster (leviathan) composed of men, created under pressure of human needs and dissolved by civil strife due to human passions. The work closed with a general "Review and Conclusion", in response to the war, which answered the question: Does a subject have the right to change allegiance when a former sovereign's power to protect is irrevocably lost?

During the years of composing Leviathan, Hobbes remained in or near Paris. In 1647, he suffered a near-fatal illness that disabled him for six months. On recovering, he resumed his literary task and completed it by 1650. Meanwhile, a translation of De Cive was being produced; scholars disagree about whether it was Hobbes who translated it.

In 1650, a pirated edition of The Elements of Law, Natural and Politic was published. It was divided into two small volumes: Human Nature, or the Fundamental Elements of Policie; and De corpore politico, or the Elements of Law, Moral and Politick.

In 1651, the translation of De Cive was published under the title Philosophical Rudiments concerning Government and Society. Also, the printing of the greater work proceeded, and finally appeared in mid-1651, titled Leviathan, or the Matter, Forme, and Power of a Common Wealth, Ecclesiastical and Civil. It had a famous title-page engraving depicting a crowned giant above the waist towering above hills overlooking a landscape, holding a sword and a crozier and made up of tiny human figures. The work had an immediate impact. Soon, Hobbes was more lauded and decried than any other thinker of his time. The first effect of its publication was to sever his link with the exiled royalists, who might well have killed him. The secularist spirit of his book greatly angered both Anglicans and French Catholics. Hobbes appealed to the revolutionary English government for protection and fled back to London in winter 1651. After his submission to the Council of State, he was allowed to subside into private life in Fetter Lane.

=== Later life ===
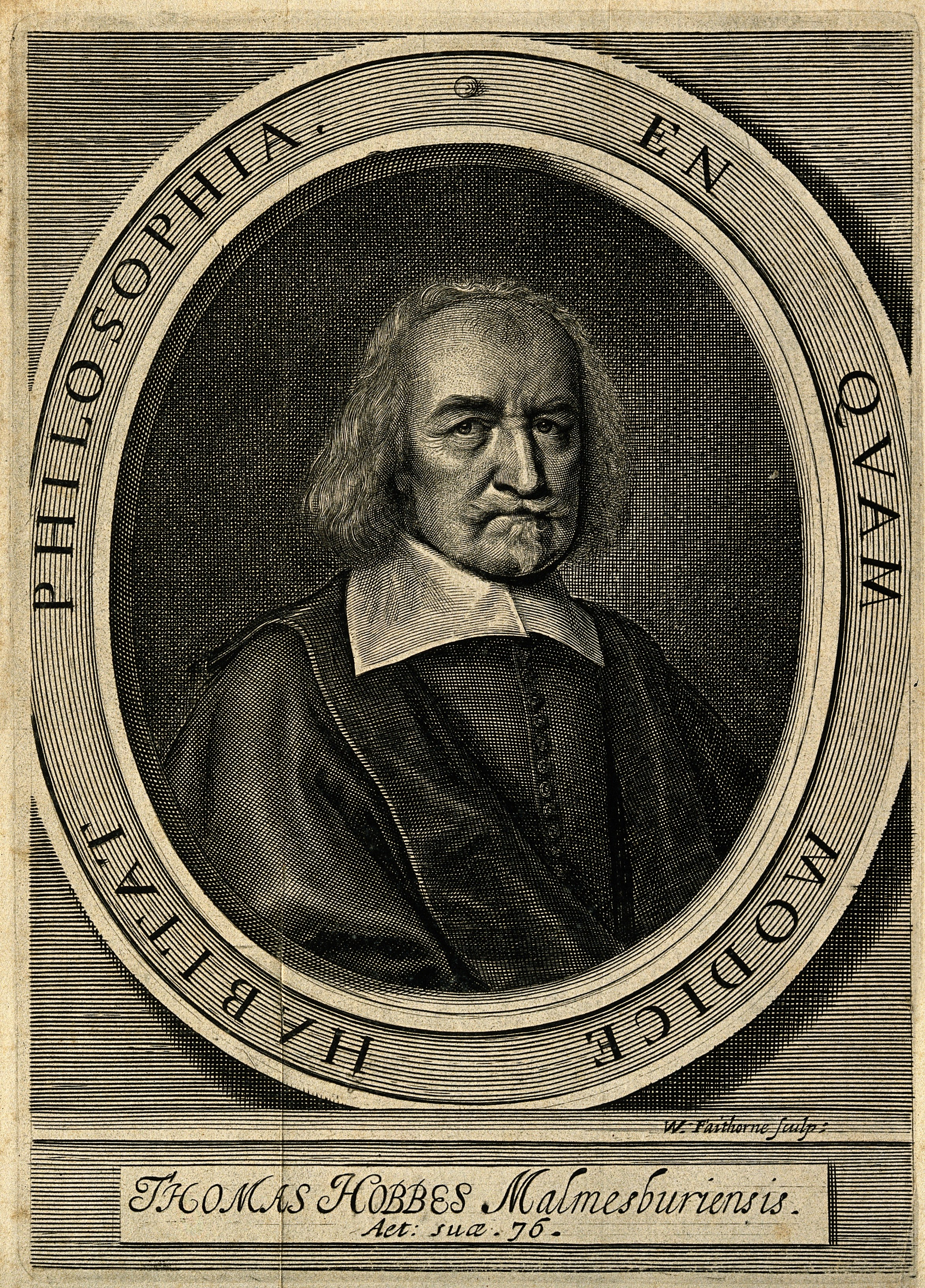
Thomas Hobbes. Line engraving by William Faithorne, 1668

In 1658, Hobbes published the final section of his philosophical system, completing the scheme he had planned more than 19 years before. De Homine consisted for the most part of an elaborate theory of vision. The remainder of the treatise dealt partially with some of the topics more fully treated in the Human Nature and the Leviathan. In addition to publishing some controversial writings on mathematics, including disciplines like geometry, Hobbes also continued to produce philosophical works.

From the time of the Restoration, he acquired a new prominence; "Hobbism" became a byword for all that respectable society ought to denounce. The young king, Hobbes's former pupil, now Charles II, remembered Hobbes and called him to the court to grant him a pension of £100.

The king was important in protecting Hobbes when, in 1666, the House of Commons introduced a bill against atheism and profaneness. That same year, on 17 October 1666, it was ordered that the committee to which the bill was referred "should be empowered to receive information touching such books as tend to atheism, blasphemy and profaneness... in particular... the book of Mr. Hobbes called the Leviathan." Hobbes was terrified at the prospect of being labelled a heretic, and proceeded to burn some of his compromising papers. At the same time, he examined the actual state of the law of heresy. The results of his investigation were first announced in three short Dialogues added as an Appendix to his Latin translation of Leviathan, published in Amsterdam in 1668. In this appendix, Hobbes aimed to show that, since the High Court of Commission had been put down, there remained no court of heresy at all to which he was amenable, and that nothing could be heresy except opposing the Nicene Creed, which, he maintained, Leviathan did not do.

The only consequence that came of the bill was that Hobbes could never thereafter publish anything in England on subjects relating to human conduct. The 1668 edition of his works was printed in Amsterdam because he could not obtain the censor's licence for its publication in England. Other writings were not made public until after his death, including Behemoth: the History of the Causes of the Civil Wars of England and of the Counsels and Artifices by which they were carried on from the year 1640 to the year 1662. For some time, Hobbes was not even allowed to respond to any attacks by his enemies. Despite this, his reputation abroad was formidable.

Hobbes spent the last four or five years of his life with his patron, William Cavendish, 1st Duke of Devonshire, at the family's Chatsworth House estate. He had been a friend of the family since 1608 when he first tutored an earlier William Cavendish. After Hobbes's death, many of his manuscripts would be found at Chatsworth House.

His final works were an autobiography in Latin verse in 1672, and a translation of four books of the Odyssey into "rugged" English rhymes that in 1673 led to a complete translation of both Iliad and Odyssey in 1675.

=== Death ===
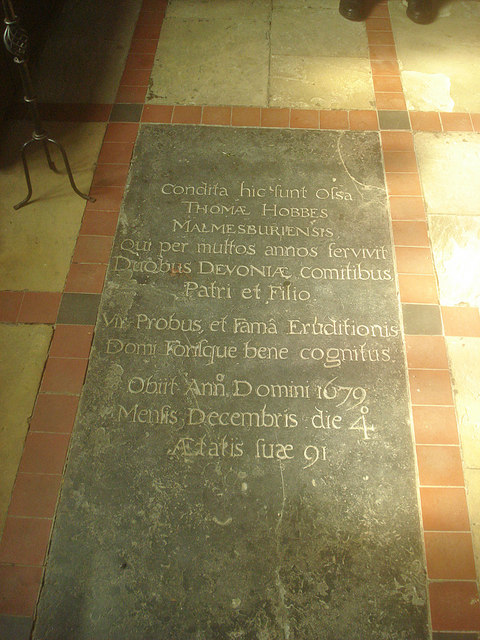
Tomb of Thomas Hobbes in St John the Baptist's Church, Ault Hucknall, in Derbyshire

In October 1679 Hobbes suffered a bladder disorder, and then a paralytic stroke, from which he died on 4 December 1679, aged 91, at Hardwick Hall, owned by the Cavendish family.

His last words were said to have been "A great leap in the dark", uttered in his final conscious moments. His body was interred in St John the Baptist's Church, Ault Hucknall, in Derbyshire.

== Political theory ==
According to Christopher Hill:

Hobbes found official political thought dominated by the idea that government was to be obeyed because ordained of God; and he substituted the theory that the state was instituted by man for his own convenience, and that it should be obeyed because the consequences of disobedience can be demonstrated to be more disagreeable than obedience, in almost all cases. That is to say, expediency, not morality, is for Hobbes the motive for political obedience.

Hobbes, influenced by contemporary scientific ideas, had intended for his political theory to be a quasi-geometrical system, in which the conclusions followed inevitably from the premises. In his theory, the state or society cannot be secure unless at the disposal of an absolute sovereign. From this follows the view that no individual can hold rights of property against the sovereign, and that the sovereign may therefore take the goods of its subjects without their consent. This particular view owes its significance to it being first developed in the 1630s when Charles I had sought to raise revenues without the consent of Parliament, and therefore of his subjects. Hobbes rejected one of the most famous theses of Aristotle's politics, namely that human beings are naturally suited to life in a polis and do not fully realize their natures until they exercise the role of citizen. It is perhaps also important to note that Hobbes extrapolated his mechanistic understanding of nature into the social and political realm, making him a progenitor of the term "social structure".

=== Leviathan ===
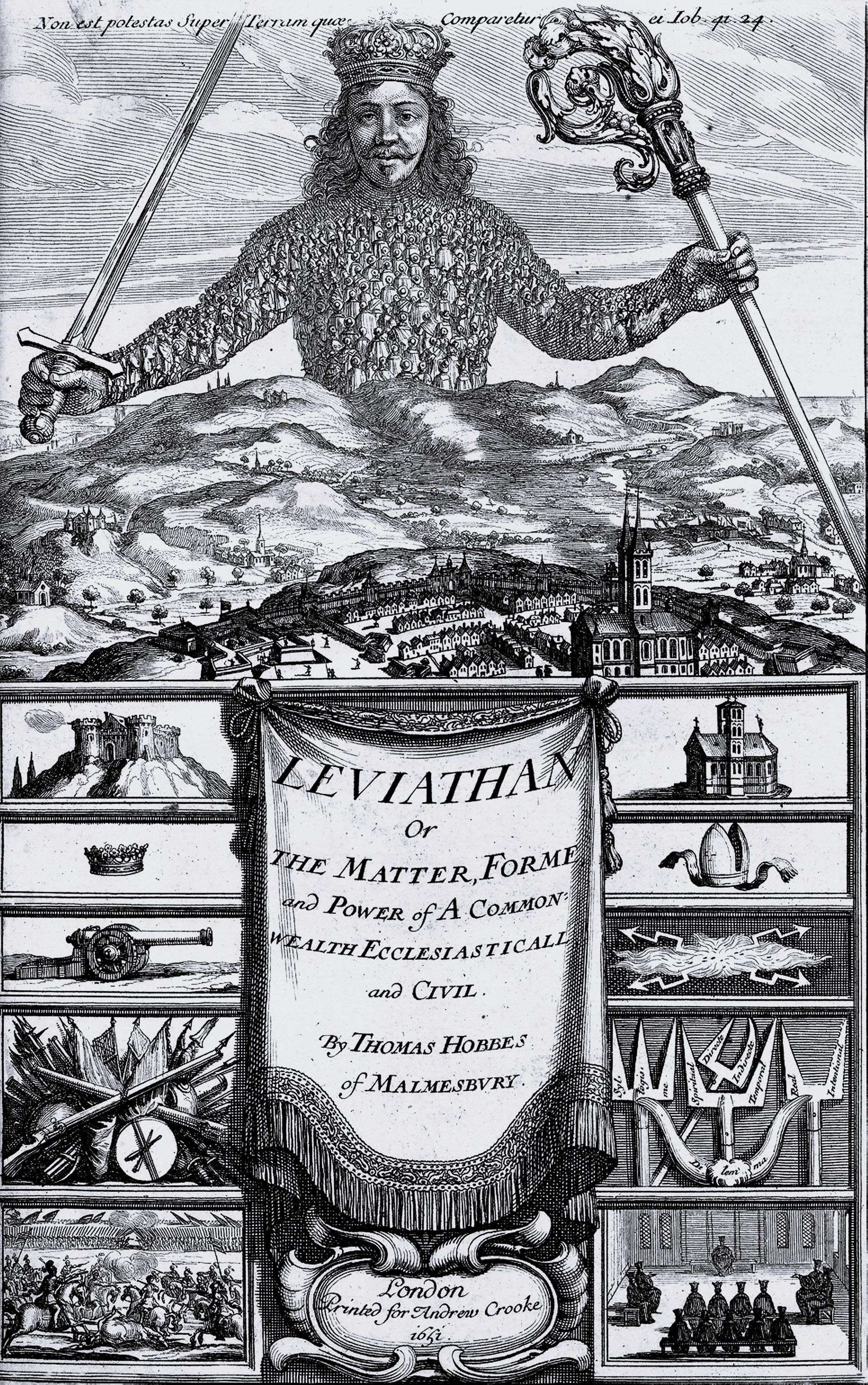
Frontispiece of Leviathan

In Leviathan, Hobbes set out his doctrine of the foundation of states and legitimate governments and created an objective science of morality. Much of the book is occupied with demonstrating the necessity of a strong central authority to avoid the evil of discord and civil war.

Beginning from a mechanistic understanding of human beings and their passions, Hobbes postulates what life would be like without government, a condition which he calls the state of nature. In that state, each person would have a right, or licence, to everything in the world. This, Hobbes argues, would lead to a "war of all against all" (bellum omnium contra omnes). The description contains one of the best-known passages in English philosophy, which describes the natural state humankind would be in, were it not for political community:

In such condition, there is no place for industry; because the fruit thereof is uncertain: and consequently no culture of the earth; no navigation, nor use of the commodities that may be imported by sea; no commodious building; no instruments of moving, and removing, such things as require much force; no knowledge of the face of the earth; no account of time; no arts; no letters; no society; and which is worst of all, continual fear, and danger of violent death; and the life of man, solitary, poor, nasty, brutish, and short.

The preface of Thomas Hobbes's Leviathan, read in his original Latin adaptation, with English subtitles

In such states, people fear death and lack both the things necessary for comfortable living, and the hope of being able to obtain them. So, in order to avoid it, people accede to a social contract and establish a civil society. According to Hobbes, society is a population and a sovereign authority, to whom all individuals in that society cede some right for the sake of protection. Power exercised by this authority cannot be resisted, because the protector's sovereign power derives from individuals' surrendering their own sovereign power for protection. The individuals are thereby the authors of all decisions made by the sovereign: "he that complaineth of injury from his sovereign complaineth that whereof he himself is the author, and therefore ought not to accuse any man but himself, no nor himself of injury because to do injury to one's self is impossible". There is no doctrine of separation of powers in Hobbes's discussion. He argues that any division of authority would lead to internal strife, jeopardizing the stability provided by an absolute sovereign. According to Hobbes, the sovereign must control civil, military, judicial and ecclesiastical powers, even the words.

== Opposition ==
=== John Bramhall ===
In 1654 a small treatise, Of Liberty and Necessity, directed at Hobbes, was published by Bishop John Bramhall. Bramhall, a strong Arminian, had met and debated with Hobbes and afterwards wrote down his views and sent them privately to be answered in this form by Hobbes. Hobbes duly replied, but not for publication. However, a French acquaintance took a copy of the reply and published it with "an extravagantly laudatory epistle". Bramhall countered in 1655, when he printed everything that had passed between them (under the title of A Defence of the True Liberty of Human Actions from Antecedent or Extrinsic Necessity).

In 1656, Hobbes was ready with The Questions Concerning Liberty, Necessity and Chance, in which he replied "with astonishing force" to the bishop. As perhaps the first clear exposition of the psychological doctrine of determinism, Hobbes's own two pieces were important in the history of the free will controversy. The bishop returned to the charge in 1658 with Castigations of Mr Hobbes's Animadversions, and also included a bulky appendix entitled The Catching of Leviathan the Great Whale.

=== John Wallis ===
Hobbes opposed the existing academic arrangements and assailed the system of the original universities in Leviathan. He went on to publish De Corpore, which contained not only tendentious views on mathematics but also an erroneous proof of the squaring of the circle. This all led mathematicians to target him for polemics and sparked John Wallis to become one of his most persistent opponents. From 1655, the publishing date of De Corpore, Hobbes and Wallis continued name-calling and bickering for nearly a quarter of a century, with Hobbes failing to admit his error to the end of his life. After years of debate, the spat over proving the squaring of the circle gained such notoriety that it has become one of the most infamous feuds in the history of mathematics.

== Religious views ==
The religious opinions of Hobbes remain controversial, as many positions have been attributed to him and range from atheism to orthodox Christianity. In The Elements of Law, Hobbes provided a cosmological argument for the existence of God, saying that God is "the first cause of all causes".

Hobbes was accused of atheism by several contemporaries; Archbishop John Bramhall accused him of teachings that could lead to atheism. This was an important accusation, and Hobbes himself wrote, in his answer to Bramhall's The Catching of Leviathan, that "atheism, impiety, and the like are words of the greatest defamation possible". Hobbes always defended himself from such accusations. In more recent times also, much has been made of his religious views by scholars such as Richard Tuck and J. G. A. Pocock, but there is still widespread disagreement about the exact significance of Hobbes's unusual views on religion.

As A.P. Martinich has pointed out, in Hobbes's time the term "atheist" was often applied to people who believed in God but not in divine providence, or to people who believed in God but also maintained other beliefs that were considered to be inconsistent with such belief or judged incompatible with orthodox Christianity. He says that this "sort of discrepancy has led to many errors in determining who was an atheist in the early modern period". In this extended early modern sense of atheism, Hobbes did take positions that strongly disagreed with church teachings of his time. For example, he argued repeatedly that there are no incorporeal substances, and that all things, including human thoughts, and even God, heaven, and hell are corporeal, matter in motion. He argued that "though Scripture acknowledge spirits, yet doth it nowhere say, that they are incorporeal, meaning thereby without dimensions and quantity". (In this view, Hobbes claimed to be following Tertullian.) Like John Locke, he also stated that true revelation can never disagree with human reason and experience, although he also argued that people should accept revelation and its interpretations for the same reason that they should accept the commands of their sovereign: in order to avoid war.

While in Venice on tour, Hobbes made the acquaintance of Fulgenzio Micanzio, a close associate of Paolo Sarpi, who had written against the pretensions of the papacy to temporal power in response to the Interdict of Pope Paul V against Venice, which refused to recognise papal prerogatives. James I had invited both men to England in 1612. Micanzio and Sarpi had argued that God willed human nature, and that human nature indicated the autonomy of the state in temporal affairs. When he returned to England in 1615, William Cavendish maintained correspondence with Micanzio and Sarpi, and Hobbes translated the latter's letters from Italian, which were circulated among the Duke's circle.

== Works ==
- 1602. Latin translation of Euripides' Medea (lost).
- 1620. "A Discourse of Tacitus", "A Discourse of Rome", and "A Discourse of Laws". In The Horae Subsecivae: Observation and Discourses.
- 1626. "De Mirabilis Pecci, Being the Wonders of the Peak in Darby-shire" (publ. 1636) – a poem on the Seven Wonders of the Peak.
- 1629. Eight Bookes of the Peloponnese Warre, translation with an Introduction of Thucydides, History of the Peloponnesian War.
- 1630. A Short Tract on First Principles
  - Authorship doubtful, as this work is attributed by important critics to Robert Payne.
- 1637. A Briefe of the Art of Rhetorique
  - Molesworth edition title: The Whole Art of Rhetoric.
  - Authorship probable: While Schuhmann (1998) firmly rejects the attribution of this work to Hobbes, a preponderance of scholarship disagrees with Schuhmann's idiosyncratic assessment. Schuhmann disagrees with historian Quentin Skinner, who would come to agree with Schuhmann.
- 1639. Tractatus Opticus II (also known as Latin Optical Manuscript)
- 1640. Elements of Law, Natural and Politic
  - Initially circulated only in handwritten copies; without Hobbes's permission, the first printed edition would be in 1650.
- 1641. Objectiones ad Cartesii Meditationes de Prima Philosophia 3rd series of Objections.
- 1642. Elementorum Philosophiae Sectio Tertia de Cive (Latin, 1st limited ed.)
- 1643. De Motu, Loco et Tempore
  - First edition (1973) with the title: Thomas White's De Mundo Examined.
- 1644. Part of the "Praefatio to Mersenni Ballistica". In F. Marini Mersenni minimi Cogitata physico-mathematica. In quibus tam naturae quàm artis effectus admirandi certissimis demonstrationibus explicantur.
- 1644. "Opticae, liber septimus" (also known as Tractatus opticus I written in 1640). In Universae geometriae mixtaeque mathematicae synopsis, edited by Marin Mersenne.
  - Molesworth edition (OL V, pp. 215–248) title: "Tractatus Opticus".
- 1646. A Minute or First Draught of the Optiques (Harley MS 3360)
  - Molesworth published only the dedication to Cavendish and the conclusion in EW VII, pp. 467–471.
- 1646. Of Liberty and Necessity (publ. 1654)
  - Published without the permission of Hobbes.
- 1647. Elementa Philosophica de Cive
  - Second expanded edition with a new Preface to the Reader.
- 1650. Answer to Sir William Davenant's Preface before Gondibert.
- 1650. Human Nature: or The Fundamental Elements of Policie
  - Includes first thirteen chapters of The Elements of Law, Natural and Politic.
  - Published without Hobbes's authorisation.
- 1650. The Elements of Law, Natural and Politic (pirated ed.)
  - Repackaged to include two parts:
    - "Human Nature, or the Fundamental Elements of Policie," ch. 14–19 of Elements, Part One (1640)
    - "De Corpore Politico", Elements, Part Two (1640)
- 1651. Philosophicall Rudiments concerning Government and Society – English translation of De Cive
- 1651. Leviathan, or the Matter, Forme, and Power of a Commonwealth, Ecclesiasticall and Civil
- 1654. Of Libertie and Necessitie, a Treatise
- 1655. De Corpore (in Latin)
- 1656. Elements of Philosophy, The First Section, Concerning Body – anonymous English translation of De Corpore
- 1656. Six Lessons to the Professor of Mathematics
- 1656. The Questions concerning Liberty, Necessity and Chance – reprint of Of Libertie and Necessitie, a Treatise, with the addition of Bramhall's reply and Hobbes's reply to Bramahall's reply.
- 1657. Stigmai, or Marks of the Absurd Geometry, Rural Language, Scottish Church Politics, and Barbarisms of John Wallis
- 1658. Elementorum Philosophiae Sectio Secunda De Homine
- 1660. Examinatio et emendatio mathematicae hodiernae qualis explicatur in libris Johannis Wallisii
- 1661. Dialogus physicus, sive De natura aeris
- 1662. Problematica Physica
  - English translation titled: Seven Philosophical Problems (1682)
- 1662. Seven Philosophical Problems, and Two Propositions of Geometry – published posthumously
- 1662. Mr. Hobbes Considered in his Loyalty, Religion, Reputation, and Manners. By way of Letter to Dr. Wallis – English autobiography
- 1666. De Principis & Ratiocinatione Geometrarum
- 1666. A Dialogue between a Philosopher and a Student of the Common Laws of England (publ. 1681)
- 1668. Leviathan – Latin translation
- 1668. An answer to a book published by Dr. Bramhall, late bishop of Derry; called the Catching of the leviathan. Together with an historical narration concerning heresie, and the punishment thereof (publ. 1682)
- 1671. Three Papers Presented to the Royal Society Against Dr. Wallis. Together with Considerations on Dr. Wallis his Answer to them
- 1671. Rosetum Geometricum, sive Propositiones Aliquot Frustra antehac tentatae. Cum Censura brevi Doctrinae Wallisianae de Motu
- 1672. Lux Mathematica. Excussa Collisionibus Johannis Wallisii
- 1673. English translation of Homer's Iliad and Odyssey
- 1674. Principia et Problemata Aliquot Geometrica Antè Desperata, Nunc breviter Explicata & Demonstrata
- 1678. Decameron Physiologicum: Or, Ten Dialogues of Natural Philosophy
- 1679. Thomae Hobbessii Malmesburiensis Vita. Authore seipso – Latin autobiography
  - Translated into English in 1680

=== Posthumous works ===
- 1680. An Historical Narration concerning Heresie, And the Punishment thereof
- 1681. Behemoth, or The Long Parliament
  - Written in 1668, it was unpublished at the request of the King
  - First pirated edition: 1679
- 1682. Seven Philosophical Problems (English translation of Problematica Physica, 1662)
- 1682. A Garden of Geometrical Roses (English translation of Rosetum Geometricum, 1671)
- 1682. Some Principles and Problems in Geometry (English translation of Principia et Problemata, 1674)
- 1688. Historia Ecclesiastica Carmine Elegiaco Concinnata

=== Complete editions ===
==== Molesworth editions ====
Editions compiled by William Molesworth.

Thomae Hobbes Malmesburiensis Opera Philosophica quae Latina Scripsit, 5 vols. 1839–1845. London: Bohn. Reprint: Aalen, 1966 (= OL)
Volume	Featured works
Volume I	Elementorum Philosophiae I: De Corpore
Volume II	Elementorum Philosophiae II and III: De Homine and De Cive
Volume III	Latin version of Leviathan
Volume IV	Various concerning mathematics, geometry and physics
Volume V	Various short works

The English Works of Thomas Hobbes of Malmesbury, 11 vols. 1839–1845. London: Bohn. Reprint: London, 1939–; Aalen, 1966 (= EW)
Volume	Featured Works
Volume 1	De Corpore translated from Latin to English
Volume 2	De Cive
Volume 3	Leviathan
Volume 4	TRIPOS; in Three Discourses: 1. Human Nature, or the Fundamental Elements of Policy; 2. De Corpore Politico, or the Elements of Law; 3. Of Liberty and Necessity; An Answer to Bishop Bramhall's Book, called "The Catching of the Leviathan"; An Historical Narration concerning Heresy, and the Punishment thereof; Considerations upon the Reputation, Loyalty, Manners, and Religion of Thomas Hobbes; Answer to Sir William Davenant's Preface before "Gondibert"; Letter to the Right Honourable Edward Howard
Volume 5	The Questions concerning Liberty, Necessity and Chance, clearly stated and debated between Dr. Bramhall Bishop of Derry and Thomas Hobbes of Malmesbury
Volume 6	A Dialogue Between a Philosopher & a Student of the Common Laws of England; A Dialogue of the Common Law; Behemoth: the History of the Causes of the Civil Wars of England, and of the Counsels and Artifices By Which They Were Carried on From the Year 1640 to the Year 1660; The Whole Art of Rhetoric (Hobbes's translation of his own Latin summary of Aristotle's Rhetoric published in 1637 with the title A Briefe of the Art of Rhetorique); The Art of Rhetoric Plainly Set Forth. With Pertinent Examples For the More Easy Understanding and Practice of the Same (this work is not of Hobbes but by Dudley Fenner, The Artes of Logike and Rethorike, 1584); The Art of Sophistry
Volume 7	Seven Philosophical Problems; Decameron Physiologicum; Proportion of a straight line to half the arc of a quadrant; Six lessons to the Savilian Professors of Mathematics; ΣΤΙΓΜΑΙ, or Marks of the absurd Geometry etc. of Dr. Wallis; Extract of a letter from Henry Stubbe; Three letters presented to the Royal Society against Dr. Wallis; Considerations on the answer of Dr. Wallis; Letters and other pieces
Volume 8	History of the Peloponnesian War by Thucydides, translated into English by Hobbes
Volume 9	History of the Peloponnesian War by Thucydides, translated into English by Hobbes
Volume 10	The Iliad and the Odyssey, translated by Hobbes into English
Volume 11	Index

==== Posthumous works not included in the Molesworth editions ====
Work	Published year	Editor	Notes
The Elements of Law, Natural and Politic (1st complete ed.)	London: 1889	Ferdinand Tönnies, with a preface and critical notes	
"Short Tract on First Principles" Pp. 193–210 in Elements, Appendix I	London: 1889	Ferdinand Tönnies, with a preface and critical notes	Attributed by important critics to Robert Payne
Tractatus opticus II (1st partial ed.) pp. 211–226 in Elements, Appendix II	London: 1889	Ferdinand Tönnies, with a preface and critical notes	1639, British Library, Harley MS 6796, ff. 193–266
Tractatus opticus II (1st complete ed.) Pp. 147–228 in Rivista critica di storia della filosofia 18	1963	Franco Alessio	Omits the diagrams
Critique du 'De mundo' de Thomas White	Paris: 1973	Jean Jacquot and Harold Whitmore Jones	Includes three appendices: De Motibus Solis, Aetheris & Telluris (pp. 439–447: a Latin poem on the movement of the Earth); Notes in English on an ancient redaction of some chapters of De Corpore (July 1643; pp. 448–460: MS 5297, National Library of Wales); Notes for the Logica and Philosophia prima of the De Corpore (pp. 461–513: Chatsworth MS A10 and the notes of Charles Cavendish on a draft of the De Corpore: British Library, Harley MS 6083)
Of the Life and History of Thucydides pp. 10–27 in Hobbes's Thucydides	New Brunswick: 1975	Richard Schlatter	
Three Discourses: A Critical Modern Edition of Newly Identified Work of the Young Hobbes (TD) pp. 10–27 in Hobbes's Thucydides	Chicago: 1975	Noel B. Reynolds and Arlene Saxonhouse	Includes: A Discourse upon the Beginning of Tacitus pp. 31–67; A Discourse of Rome, pp. 71–102; A Discourse of Law, pp. 105–119
Thomas Hobbes' A Minute or First Draught of the Optiques: A Critical Edition	University of Wisconsin-Madison: 1983 - PhD dissertation	Elaine C. Stroud	British Library, Harley MS 3360
Of Passions pp. 729–738 in Rivista di storia della filosofia 43	1988	Anna Minerbi Belgrado	Edition of the unpublished manuscript Harley 6093
The Correspondence of Thomas Hobbes (I: 1622–1659; II: 1660–1679) Clarendon Edition, vol. 6–7	Oxford: 1994	Noel Malcolm	

=== Translations in modern English ===
- De Corpore, Part I. Computatio Sive Logica. Edited with an Introductory Essay by L. C. Hungerland and G. R. Vick. Translation and Commentary by A. Martinich. New York: Abaris Books, 1981.
- Thomas White's De mundo Examined, translation by H. W. Jones, Bradford: Bradford University Press, 1976 (the appendices of the Latin edition (1973) are not enclosed).

=== New critical editions of Hobbes's works ===
- Clarendon Edition of the Works of Thomas Hobbes, Oxford: Clarendon Press (10 volumes published of 27 planned).
- Traduction des œuvres latines de Hobbes, under the direction of Yves Charles Zarka, Paris: Vrin (5 volumes published of 17 planned).

== See also ==
- Joseph Butler
- Conatus § In Hobbes
- Natural and legal rights § Thomas Hobbes
- Natural law § Hobbes
- Thought § Computationalism
- Hobbesian trap
- Hobbes's moral and political philosophy
- Leviathan and the Air-Pump
- Social physics

== Citations ==
=== Sources ===
- "Hinduism" to "Home, Earls of" at Project Gutenberg

Attribution:
