= Analytic Philosophy (journal) =

- Discipline: Philosophy
- Language: English
- Edited by: David Sosa

Publication details
- Former name: Philosophical Books
- History: 1960–present
- Publisher: Wiley
- Frequency: Quarterly

Standard abbreviations
- ISO 4: Anal. Philos.

Indexing
- ISSN: 2153-9596 (print); 2153-960X (web)
- OCLC no.: 758301370
- Philosophical Books
- ISSN: 0031-8051 (print); 1468-0149 (web)

Links
- Journal homepage; Online access; Online archive

Analytic Philosophy is a quarterly peer-reviewed academic journal covering all areas of philosophy. It is published by Wiley and the editor-in-chief is David Sosa (University of Texas at Austin). It was established in 1960 as Philosophical Books, obtaining its current title in 2011.

== Abstracting and indexing ==
The journal is abstracted and indexed in the Arts and Humanities Citation Index, Current Contents/Arts & Humanities, and the Philosopher's Index.
