= State of nature =

Hypothetical conditions of human life before society

In ethics, political philosophy, social contract theory, religion, and international law, the term state of nature describes the way of life that existed before humans organised themselves into societies or civilisations. Philosophers of the state-of-nature theory propose that there was a historical period before societies existed, and seek answers to the questions: "What was life like before civil society?", "How did government emerge from such a primitive start?", and "What are the reasons for entering a state of society by establishing a nation-state?".

In some versions of social contract theory, there are freedoms, but no rights in the state of nature; and, by way of the social contract, people create societal rights and obligations. In other versions of social contract theory, society imposes restrictions (law, custom, tradition, etc.) that limit the natural rights of a person. Societies existing before the political state are investigated and studied as Mesolithic history, as archaeology, and as cultural anthropology, as social anthropology, and as ethnology to determine the particulars of the indigenous society's social structures and power structures.

== Noted philosophers ==
=== Mozi ===
The early Warring States philosopher Mozi was one of the first thinkers in recorded history to develop the idea of the state of nature. He developed the idea to defend the need for a single overall ruler. According to Mozi, in the state of nature, each person has their own moral rules (yi, 義). As a result, people were unable to reach agreements and resources were wasted. Since Mozi promoted ways of strengthening and unifying the state (li, 利), such natural dis-organisation was rejected:

In the beginning of human life, when there was yet no law and government, the custom was "everybody according to his rule (yi, 義)." Accordingly each man had his own rule, two men had two different rules and ten men had eleven different rules—the more people the more different notions. And everybody approved his own moral views and disapproved the views of others, and so arose mutual disapproval among men. As a result, father and son and elder and younger brothers became enemies and were estranged from each other, since they were unable to reach any agreement. Everybody worked for the disadvantage of the others with water, fire, and poison. Surplus energy was not spent for mutual aid; surplus goods were allowed to rot without sharing; excellent teachings (dao, 道) were kept secret and not revealed. The disorder in the (human) world could be compared to that among birds and beasts. — Chapter 3 – 1

His proposal was to unify rules according to a single moral system or standard (fa, 法) that can be used by anyone: calculating benefit of each act. In that way, the ruler of the state and his subjects will have the same moral system; cooperation and joint efforts will be the rule. Later his proposal would be strongly rejected by Confucianism (especially Mencius) because of the preference of benefit over morals.

=== Thomas Hobbes ===
The pure state of nature, or "the natural condition of mankind", was described by the 17th century English philosopher Thomas Hobbes in Leviathan and his earlier work De Cive. Hobbes argued that natural inequalities between humans are not so great as to give anyone clear superiority; and thus all must live in constant fear of loss or violence; so that "during the time men live without a common power to keep them all in awe, they are in that condition which is called war; and such a war as is of every man against every man". In this state, every person has a natural right to do anything one thinks necessary for preserving one's own life, and life is "solitary, poor, nasty, brutish, and short" (Leviathan, Chapters XIII–XIV). Hobbes described this natural condition with the Latin phrase (bellum omnium contra omnes) meaning "war of all against all", in De Cive.

Within the state of nature, there is neither personal property nor injustice since there is no law, except for certain natural precepts discovered by reason ("laws of nature"): the first of which is "that every man ought to endeavour peace, as far as he has hope of obtaining it" (Leviathan, Ch. XIV); and the second is "that a man be willing, when others are so too, as far forth as for peace and defence of himself he shall think it necessary, to lay down this right to all things; and be contented with so much liberty against other men as he would allow other men against himself" (loc. cit.). From here, Hobbes developed the way out of the state of nature into political society and government by mutual contracts.

According to Hobbes, the state of nature exists at all times among independent countries, over whom there is no law except for those same precepts or laws of nature (Leviathan, Chapters XIII, XXX end). His view of the state of nature helped to serve as a basis for theories of international law and relations and even some theories about domestic relations.

=== John Locke ===
John Locke considers the state of nature in his Second Treatise on Civil Government written around the time of the Exclusion Crisis in England during the 1680s. For Locke, in the state of nature all men are free "to order their actions, and dispose of their possessions and persons, as they think fit, within the bounds of the law of nature." (2nd Tr., §4). "The state of Nature has a law of Nature to govern it", and that law is reason. Locke believes that reason teaches that "no one ought to harm another in his life, liberty, and or property" (2nd Tr., §6); and that transgressions of this may be punished. Locke describes the state of nature and civil society to be opposites of each other, and the need for civil society comes in part from the perpetual existence of the state of nature. This view of the state of nature is partly deduced from Christian belief (unlike Hobbes, whose philosophy is not dependent upon any prior theology).

Although it may be natural to assume that Locke was responding to Hobbes, Locke never refers to Hobbes by name, and may instead have been responding to other writers of the day, like Robert Filmer. In fact, Locke's First Treatise is entirely a response to Filmer's Patriarcha, and takes a step by step method to refuting Filmer's theory set out in Patriarcha. The conservative party at the time had rallied behind Filmer's Patriarcha, whereas the Whigs, scared of another persecution of Protestants, rallied behind the theory set out by Locke in his Two Treatises of Government as it gave a clear theory as to why the people would be justified in overthrowing a monarchy which abuses the trust they had placed in it.

=== Montesquieu ===
Montesquieu makes use of the concept of the state of nature in his The Spirit of the Laws, first printed in 1748. Montesquieu states the thought process behind early human beings before the formation of society. He says that human beings would have the faculty of knowing and would first think to preserve their life in the state. Human beings would also at first feel themselves to be impotent and weak. As a result, humans would not be likely to attack each other in this state. Next, humans would seek nourishment and, out of fear and impulse, would eventually unite to create society. Once society was created, a state of war would ensue amongst societies, which would all have been created the same way. The purpose of war is the preservation of the society and the self. The formation of law within society is the reflection and application of reason for Montesquieu.

=== Jean-Jacques Rousseau ===
Hobbes' view was challenged in the eighteenth century by Jean-Jacques Rousseau, who claimed that Hobbes was taking socialized people and simply imagining them living outside of the society in which they were raised. He affirmed instead that people were neither good nor bad, but were born as a blank slate, and later society and the environment influence which way we lean. In Rousseau's state of nature, people did not know each other enough to come into serious conflict and they did have normal values. The modern society, and the inception of private property, is blamed for the disruption of the state of nature which Rousseau sees as true freedom. According to David Wootton, whereas preceding social contract theorists treated the state of nature as a theoretical, not historical, condition that exists where government is absent (e.g. on the open ocean), Rousseau approached the transition from nature to society as a historical reality. However, Frederick Neuhouser argues that Rousseau's account is no more than a philosophical device to separate the natural and artificial parts of human psychology.

=== David Hume ===
David Hume offers in A Treatise of Human Nature (1739) that human beings are naturally social: "'Tis utterly impossible for men to remain any considerable time in that savage condition, which precedes society; but that his very first state and situation may justly be esteem'd social. This, however, hinders not, but that philosophers may, if they please, extend their reasoning to the suppos'd state of nature; provided they allow it to be a mere philosophical fiction, which never had, and never could have any reality."

Hume's ideas about human nature expressed in the Treatise suggest that he would be happy with neither Hobbes' nor his contemporary Rousseau's thought-experiments. He explicitly derides as incredible the hypothetical humanity described in Hobbes' Leviathan. Additionally, he argues in "Of the Origin of Justice and Property" that if humankind were universally benevolent, we would not hold Justice to be a virtue: "’tis only from the selfishness and confin’d generosity of men, along with the scanty provision nature has made for his wants, that justice derives its origin."

=== John Calhoun ===
John C. Calhoun, in his A Disquisition on Government (1851), wrote that a state of nature is merely hypothetical and argues that the concept is self-contradictory and that political states naturally always existed.

It is, indeed, difficult to explain how an opinion so destitute of all sound reason, ever could have been so extensively entertained. . . . I refer to the assertion, that all men are equal in the state of nature; meaning, by a state of nature, a state of individuality, supposed to have existed prior to the social and political state; and in which men lived apart and independent of each other. . . . But such a state is purely hypothetical. It never did, nor can exist; as it is inconsistent with the preservation and perpetuation of the race. It is, therefore, a great misnomer to call it the state of nature. Instead of being the natural state of man, it is, of all conceivable states, the most opposed to his nature—most repugnant to his feelings, and most incompatible with his wants. His natural state is, the social and political—the one for which his Creator made him, and the only one in which he can preserve and perfect his race. As, then, there never was such a state as the, so-called, state of nature, and never can be, it follows, that men, instead of being born in it, are born in the social and political state; and of course, instead of being born free and equal, are born subject, not only to parental authority, but to the laws and institutions of the country where born, and under whose protection they draw their first breath.

=== Karl Marx ===
Marx criticized the accounts given by thinkers like Rousseau as projections of contemporary society onto an imagined past, rejecting the notion of a "fictitious primordial condition" as pseudohistorical. For Marx, the "essence of man is no abstraction inherent in each single individual. In reality, it is the ensemble of the social relations". He uses the term Gattunsgwesen (species-being) to describe human nature, which is realized through free, conscious activity. In their "species-life", humans create, articulate, and perceive themselves in their work and in the objective results of that work. In other words, what constitutes human good is "the ability to structure the material world in accordance with their own purposes".

In Das Kapital, Marx affirms that man is a social animal and that the "life-process of society" is based on material production. Labor, in turn, is the "process in which both man and Nature participate, and in which man of his own accord starts, regulates, and controls the material re-actions between himself and Nature". What distinguishes human labor from that of other animals, Marx argues, is self-consciousness whereby the result of the labor-process had already existed in the imagination of the laborer. The attraction of man to the nature of the work is that it "gives play to his bodily and mental powers", and this process "demands that [...] the workman's will be steadily in consonance with his purpose".

=== John Rawls ===
John Rawls used what amounted to an artificial state of nature. To develop his theory of justice, Rawls places everyone in the original position. The original position is a hypothetical state of nature used as a thought experiment. People in the original position have no society and are under a veil of ignorance that prevents them from knowing how they may benefit from society. They lack foreknowledge of their intelligence, wealth, or abilities. Rawls reasons that people in the original position would want a society where they had their basic liberties protected and where they had some economic guarantees as well. If society were to be constructed from scratch through a social agreement between individuals, these principles would be the expected basis of such an agreement. Thus, these principles should form the basis of real, modern societies since everyone should consent to them if society were organized from scratch in fair agreements.

=== Robert Nozick ===
Rawls' Harvard colleague Robert Nozick countered the liberal A Theory of Justice with the libertarian Anarchy, State, and Utopia, also grounded in the state of nature tradition. Nozick argued that a minimalist state of property rights and basic law enforcement would develop out of a state of nature without violating anyone's rights or using force. Mutual agreements among individuals rather than social contract would lead to this minimal state.

== Between nations ==
In Hobbes' view, once a civil government is instituted, the state of nature has disappeared between individuals because of the civil power which exists to enforce contracts and the laws of nature generally. Between nations, however, no such power exists and therefore nations have the same rights to preserve themselves—including making war—as individuals possessed. Such a conclusion led some writers to the idea of an association of nations or worldwide civil society, an example being Immanuel Kant's work on perpetual peace.

Rawls also examines the state of nature between nations. In his work the Law of Peoples, Rawls applies a modified version of his original position thought experiment to international relationships. Rawls says that peoples, not states, form the basic unit that should be examined. States should be encouraged to follow the principles from Rawls' earlier A Theory of Justice. Democracy seems like it would be the most logical means of accomplishing these goals, but benign non-democracies should be seen as acceptable at the international stage. Rawls develops eight principles for how a people should act on an international stage.

Within international relations theory, anarchy is the state of affairs wherein nations exist without a higher power to govern them. The three principal schools of international relations theory hold different beliefs about anarchy and how to approach it. Realism approaches global politics as if the world's nations were each an individual under a state of nature: it tends to take anarchy for granted, and does not see a solution to it as possible or even necessarily desirable. Liberalism claims that anarchy may be mitigated through the spread of liberal democracy and the use of international organizations, thus creating a global civil society; this approach may be summed up by the words of George H. W. Bush, who sought to create "a world where the rule of law, not the law of the jungle, governs the conduct of nations". Constructivist theorists, like liberals, also do not see anarchy as a given in international affairs, but are open to other approaches besides those given by realists and liberals.

== See also ==
- Natural law
- Law of the jungle
- Antisocial personality disorder
- Noble savage
- Primitive communism
- Primitivism
- Social Darwinism
