= De Cive =

1642 book by Thomas Hobbes

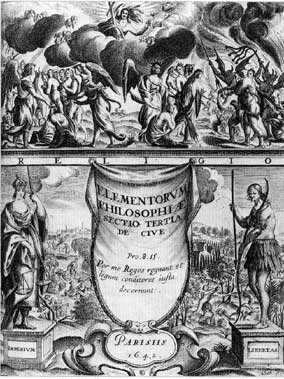
- Frontispiece of De Cive, engraved by Jean Matheus. Between the state of nature and the civil life there is a large drape in the shape of amphora with the title of the work and a biblical quotation taken from Proverbs 8:15: Per me Reges regnant et legum conditores iusta decernunt ('By me kings reign, and rulers decree what is just')
- Author: Thomas Hobbes
- Cover artist: Jean Matheus
- Language: Latin, English
- Publication date: 1642, 1647
- Publication place: France, Netherlands, England
- English publication date: 1651
- Media type: paper

De Cive ('On the Citizen') is one of Thomas Hobbes' major works. The book was published originally in Latin from Paris in 1642, followed by two further Latin editions in 1647 from Amsterdam. The English translation of the work made its first appearance four years later (London 1651) under the title Philosophicall rudiments concerning government and society.

It anticipates themes of the better-known Leviathan. The famous phrase bellum omnium contra omnes ('war of all against all') appeared first in De Cive.

== Background ==
De Cive is the first of a trilogy of works written by Hobbes dealing with human knowledge, the other two works in the trilogy being De Corpore ('On the Body'), published in 1655, and De Homine ('On Man'), published in 1658. Because of the political turmoil of the time, namely the unrest leading up to the Civil War of 1642, Hobbes hastily "ripened and plucked" the work which would systematically come last: De Cive. This work comprises three parts: Libertas ('Liberty'), Imperium ('Dominion'), and Religio ('Religion'). In the first part, he describes man's natural condition, dealing with the natural laws; in the second, the necessity of establishing a stable government is indicated. Finally, in the third part, he writes about religion.

== Publication ==
De Cive was finished in November 1641 – before the English Civil War (thus arguments repeated a decade later in Leviathan cannot exclusively be influenced by that war). The book was published in Latin in 1642; a revised edition appeared in 1647. It was translated into English, entitled Philosophicall Rudiments Concerning Government and Society (published in 1651). John Aubrey testifies that Hobbes translated part of the work into English himself with such success that an intended translator would rather leave Hobbes to do the job; it is not certain whether this was indeed the case.

The edition of the work by H. Warrender (Latin and English versions; Oxford: Clarendon Press, 1983) is at present standard.

== See also ==
- Homo homini lupus
