= Aloysius Martinich =

American philosopher

- Born: Aloysius Patrick Martinich; June 28, 1946 (age 79)
- Spouse: Leslie Martinich

Education
- Education: University of Windsor (BA, 1969); UCSD (MA 1971; PhD 1973)

Philosophical work
- Era: Contemporary philosophy
- Region: Western philosophy
- School: Analytic philosophy
- Institutions: University of Texas at Austin
- Main interests: Philosophy of language
- Website: liberalarts.utexas.edu/philosophy/faculty/apm46

Aloysius Patrick Martinich (born June 28, 1946), usually cited as A. P. Martinich, is an American analytic philosopher. He is the Roy Allison Vaughan Centennial Professor Emeritus in Philosophy at University of Texas at Austin. His areas of interest are the nature and practice of interpretation, history of modern philosophy, the philosophy of language, the history of political thinking and Thomas Hobbes.

== Biography ==
Martinich has specialized in the philosophy of language and the philosophy of Thomas Hobbes. He is the author of The Two Gods of Leviathan (1992), Hobbes: A Biography (1999), and Hobbes's Political Philosophy (2021).

== Publications ==
=== Books ===
- Thomas Hobbes, Computatio sive Logica: Part One of De Corpore, translation and commentary, New York: Abaris Books, 1981.
- The Philosophy of Language (Critical Concepts in Philosophy), New York: Oxford University Press, 1985 (sixth edition edited with David Sosa, 2012).
- Philosophical Writing: An Introduction, Englewood Cliffs, N.J.: Prentice-Hall, 1989; fourth edition Wiley-Blackwell Publishers, 2015.
- The Two Gods of Leviathan: Thomas Hobbes on Religion and Politics, Cambridge: Cambridge University Press, 1992.
- A Hobbes Dictionary. Oxford: Blackwell, 1995.
- Thomas Hobbes Perspectives on British History, London: Macmillan, 1997.
- Hobbes: A Biography, New York: Cambridge University Press, 1999.
- A Companion to Analytic Philosophy, edited with David Sosa, Oxford: Blackwell, 2001.
- Leviathan, Peterborough, Ont.: Broadview Press, 2002; revised edition with Brian Battiste, 2011.
- Hobbes (The Routledge Philosophers), New York: Routledge, 2005.
- Early Modern Philosophy: Essential Readings with Commentary, Malden: Blackwell Readings in the History of Philosophy, 2007.
- Much Ado About Nonexistence: Fiction and Reference (with Avrum Stroll), Lanham, MD: Rowman & Littlefield, 2007.
