= Jean Matheus =

French engraver

Jean Matheus (c. 1590–1672) was a 17th-century French engraver who flourished during the 1620s. He is best known for his work in Nicholas Renouard's edition of Ovid's Metamorphoses, published in Paris in 1619 and engraved portraits of saints.
