= Caporali =

Caporali is an Italian surname. Notable people with the surname include:

- Bartolomeo Caporali (c. 1420–c. 1503–1505), Italian Renaissance painter
- Carlo Caporali (born 1994), Italian footballer
- Giovanni Battista Caporali (c. 1476–1560), Italian Renaissance painter
- Giulio Caporali (fl. 1540), Italian Renaissance painter
