= Adamo Rossi =

Italian clergyman, scholar and librarian (1821–1891)

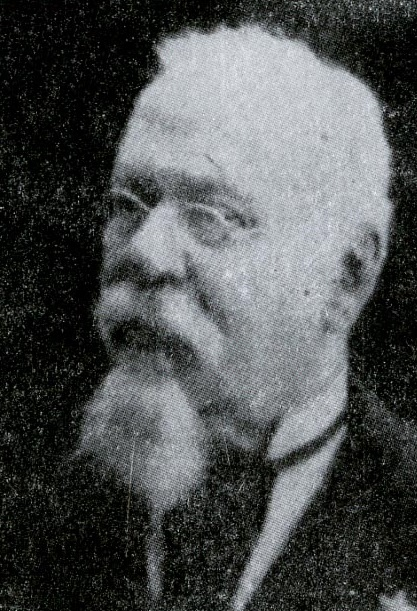
Adamo Rossi

Adamo Rossi (March 5, 1821 in Petrignano – February 22, 1891 in Perugia) was an Italian clergyman, revolutionary patriot, scholar and librarian.

== Career ==
After studying at the archdiocesan seminary of Perugia, Rossi took part in the First Italian War of Independence as a military chaplain for the Perugia volunteers. Back in Perugia, he maintained a long correspondence with the government of the Roman Republic, which at the time seized power in the city of Rome and expelled the Pope. This caused Rossi to be suspended from his clerical position by Pope Pius IX and removed from his teaching job.

In 1857 he was appointed librarian at the Library Augusta (of which he was director from 1858 to 1886). After 1860 – with the end of rule by the Papal States – he also taught Italian and Latin at a high school.

In 1862 Rossi definitely broke with the Church, resigned from his ecclesiastical position and got married. He devoted himself entirely to the study of palaeography, diplomatics and the social, literary and artistic history of Perugia, and produced extensive publications. He was commissioned by the Municipality of Perugia to draw up an inventory of codices, books and paintings confiscated from monasteries. In 1868 Rossi published in his Ricerche per le biblioteche di Perugia three novelle by Antonio Francesco Grazzini, from a 16th-century manuscript found in the Comunale of Perugia.

=== Theft allegation ===
In 1885, suspicion of theft fell on Rossi, with regard to the disappearance of an illuminated manuscript of Cicero's De Officiis. He underwent a lengthy administrative and judicial investigation, which eventually exonerated him of the theft but did reveal evidence of gross negligence. Embittered by this affair, Rossi resigned the following year and went on to teach Latin at the high school of Bevagna. He died shortly thereafter, of cardiac complications.

The culprit in the theft was never found. Suspicion fell on a janitor who a few years later became well-to-do enough to build for himself a fine house. The former janitor's house was nicknamed "Villa Cicero" by residents of Perugia.
