= Grazzini =

Grazzini is an Italian surname. It may refer to:

- Anton Francesco Grazzini (1810–1879), Italian and Russian general
- Antonio Francesco Grazzini (1503–1584), Italian author
- Benedetto Grazzini (1474–c.1552), Italian architect and sculptor
- Marco Grazzini, Canadian actor
- Sebastián Grazzini (born 1981), Argentine footballer
