= Mary Clarke (letter writer) =

17th-century English letter writer

- Born: Mary Jepp; 1650s Somerset
- Died: 1705
- Burial place: Chew Magna
- Known for: Letter Writing
- Spouse: Edward Clarke (m.1675)
- Children: 11
- Parents: Samuel Jepp (father); Elizabeth Buckland (mother)
- Relatives: John Locke, cousin

Mary Clarke (née Jepp; died 1705) was an English gentlewoman who is remembered as a prolific letter writer. She married Edward Clarke on 13 April 1675 and had eleven children with him. Whilst he spent time in London as a Member of Parliament, she ran the family estate at Chipley in Somerset and raised their children. Clarke corresponded frequently with her husband by letter and also exchanged messages with the philosopher John Locke.

== Early life ==
Mary Clarke was born in Somerset to father Samuel and mother Elizabeth Jepp (née Buckland) in the 1650s. Both her parents died when she was young and she was brought up by her maternal grandmother, Elizabeth Baber. When Baber died in 1672, Clarke inherited lands worth £400 (equivalent to £100,000 in 2025).

== Career ==
Mary Jepp married Edward Clarke on 13 April 1675. They had eleven children, three of whom died in infancy; the eight who lived to adulthood were called Edward (Ward), Elizabeth (Betty), Anne (Nanny), John (Jack), Mary (Molly), Jepp, Samuel (Sammy) and Jane (Jenny) respectively. The Clarkes first lived in London, then moved to the Chipley Park estate in Chipley, Somerset, where they rebuilt the manor house. Edward Clarke became Member of Parliament for Taunton in 1690 and spent most of his time in London when Parliament was sitting, leaving Mary Clarke to bring up the children and run the estate. Following his involvement in organising the Great Recoinage of 1696, her husband became unpopular locally since he was held responsible for the resulting hardship and his local enemies circulated rumours. This forced him to stay in London for his own safety as Clarke endeavoured to clear his name in Taunton.

Clarke was a committed letter writer and communicated prolifically with her husband. Many letters are held by the Somerset Archives and Local Studies. Her witty letters show a keen mind which was engaged with the social and political issues of the time, as well as matters of personal interest such as farming and estate management. Much was written about their children, discussing their studies, health and progress in life. As the children matured, the parents wrote to each other about their various plans; for example, they discussed the logistics of Betty's marriage and Jack's ambitions to become a merchant (he would later be apprenticed to Benjamin Furly). Hundreds of letters have survived, others were lost or destroyed.

The Clarkes also wrote to John Locke, who was a friend of Edward and a cousin of Mary; Locke had previously suggested that Clarke marry his friend Sir William Pelham. His replies in their three-way discussions concerning the education of Edward Junior were later published in 1693 as Some Thoughts Concerning Education. The communications included almost 400 letters later published in the Correspondence of John Locke. Some Thoughts Concerning Education was concerned solely with the upbringing of young men, but Locke also wrote privately to the Clarkes about young women and their daughter Elizabeth became a favourite of his. Mary Clarke's practical concerns sometimes clashed with Locke's idealistic view of parenting, for example she used servants to help with childcare despite him declaring it would be better not to and she was unable to find the time to read Latin to her son for two hours every day. He believed that every child could be moulded in the same way, but Edward appeared slow-witted and one of his tutors asked to be released, saying he had taught him as much as was possible. Clarke was concerned, writing to Locke that Edward seemed "a sort of downe right honest Blockheaded boy". Locke believed in home education and recommended a Huguenot tutor, however after employing a series of tutors the Clarkes decided to send their children to schools.

== Death and legacy ==
Clarke died at Chipley on 10 January 1705. She was buried on 8 February in Chew Magna.
