= Of the Conduct of the Understanding =

Text by John Locke

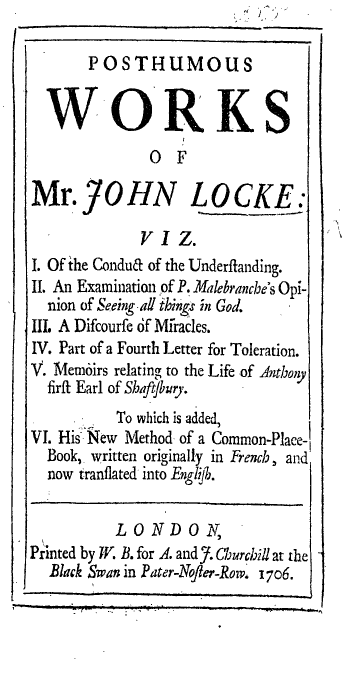
- Title page from the first edition
- Author: John Locke
- Language: English
- Subject: Education, philosophy
- Publisher: Awnsham and John Churchill
- Publication date: 1706
- Publication place: England
- Text: Of the Conduct of the Understanding at Wikisource

Of the Conduct of the Understanding is a text on clear and rational thought by John Locke, published in 1706, two years after the author's death, as part of Peter King's Posthumous Works of John Locke. It complements Locke's Some Thoughts Concerning Education, which explains how to educate children.

The text espouses the importance of rational self-examination and its virtues when combating mental illness. Moral purity and sanity were, according to Locke, inextricably linked to self-scrutiny and mental freedom.

In this tract, Locke also points out that "there are instances of very mean people, who have raised their minds to a great sense and understanding of religion," such as Huguenot "peasantry." In a 1731 sermon, delivered in New England and published the next year, George Berkeley countered that this Lockean observation had proven irrelevant to his examples of northeastern "peasant" communities, such as the Narragansett people, because they "do not at present amount to one thousand, including every age and sex. And these are nearly all servants or laborers to the English." Despite these comments, Redwood Library and Athenaeum shareholders in Rhode Island, and even an author of the bylaws, included Of the Conduct of the Understanding in their personal "Farm" libraries.

== See also ==
- George Mason Memorial, Washington, D.C., includes Of the Conduct of the Understanding as an element of the statue of a seated Mason.
