= Giovanni Battista Caporali =

Italian painter

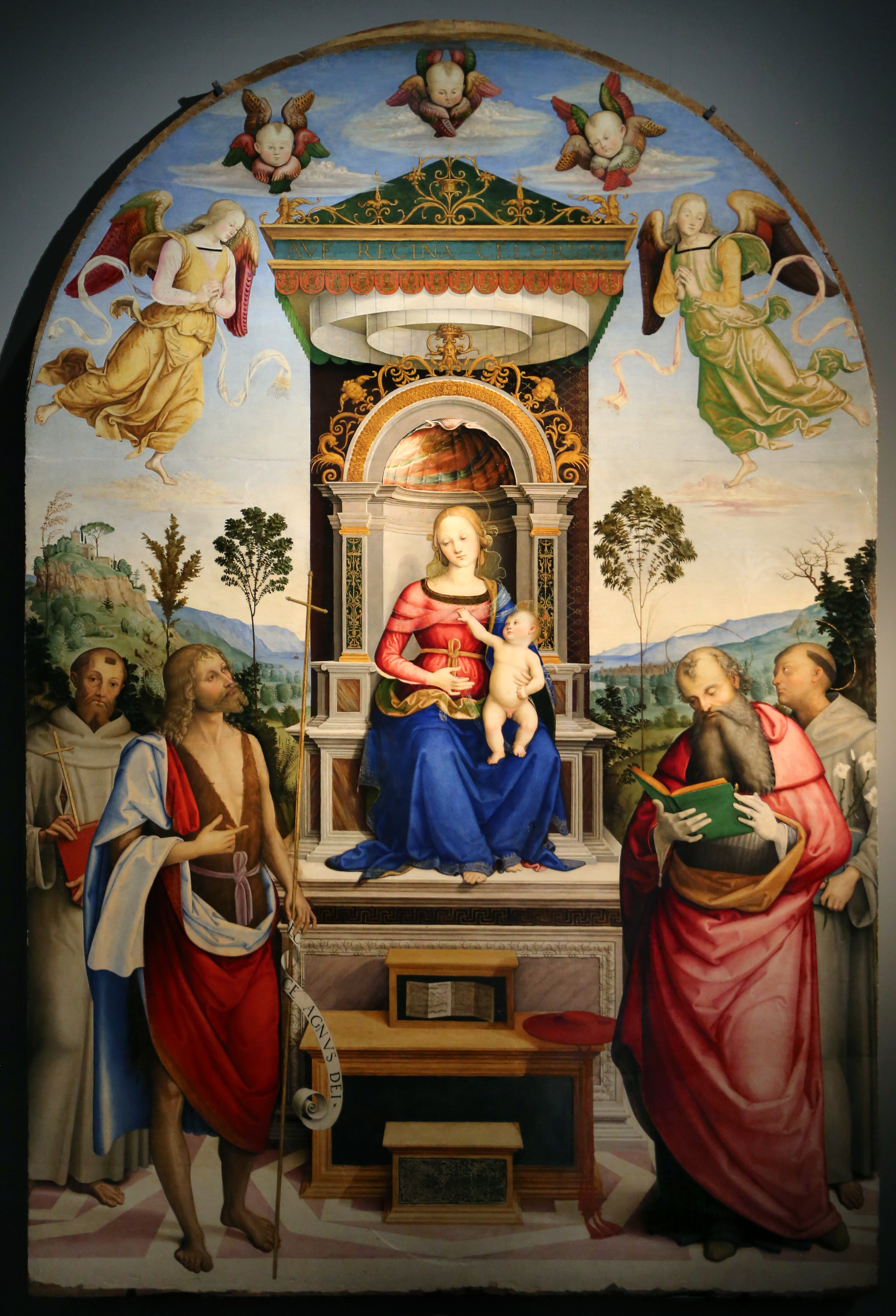
Altarpiece of Saint Jerome in Perugia, c. 1510-12

Giovanni Battista Caporali (c. 1476–1560) was an Italian painter of the Renaissance.

He was also called Bitte, a diminutive of his Christian name and by Vasari, Benedetto, was the son of Bartolommeo Caporali, and was born at Perugia. He was a pupil of Perugino, and also an architect, and built a palace near Cortona for Cardinal Silvio Passerini, which he likewise decorated with frescoes, in the execution of which he was aided by Tommaso Barnabei, better known as Maso Papacello. Many of the churches in Perugia and its neighborhood possess works by Caporali. Other examples may be found in Cortona. His son Giulio Caporali was an architect of the Panicale Cathedral. Another pupil of Caporali was Organtino di Mariano, active 1533 and worked with Giovanni Battista in the church of San Pietro of Perugia.
