= Farmacia del Moro, Florence =

Pharmacy in Florence, Italy

Coordinates: 43°46′24.7″N 11°15′16.6″E

The Farmacia del Moro, also called Farmacia del Saraceno (referencing Moor and Saracen) was a pharmacy located facing Piazza San Giovanni and the San Giovanni Battista Baptistry in Florence, region of Tuscany, Italy. The locale originally faced Via Cerretani, facing Canto alla Paglia.

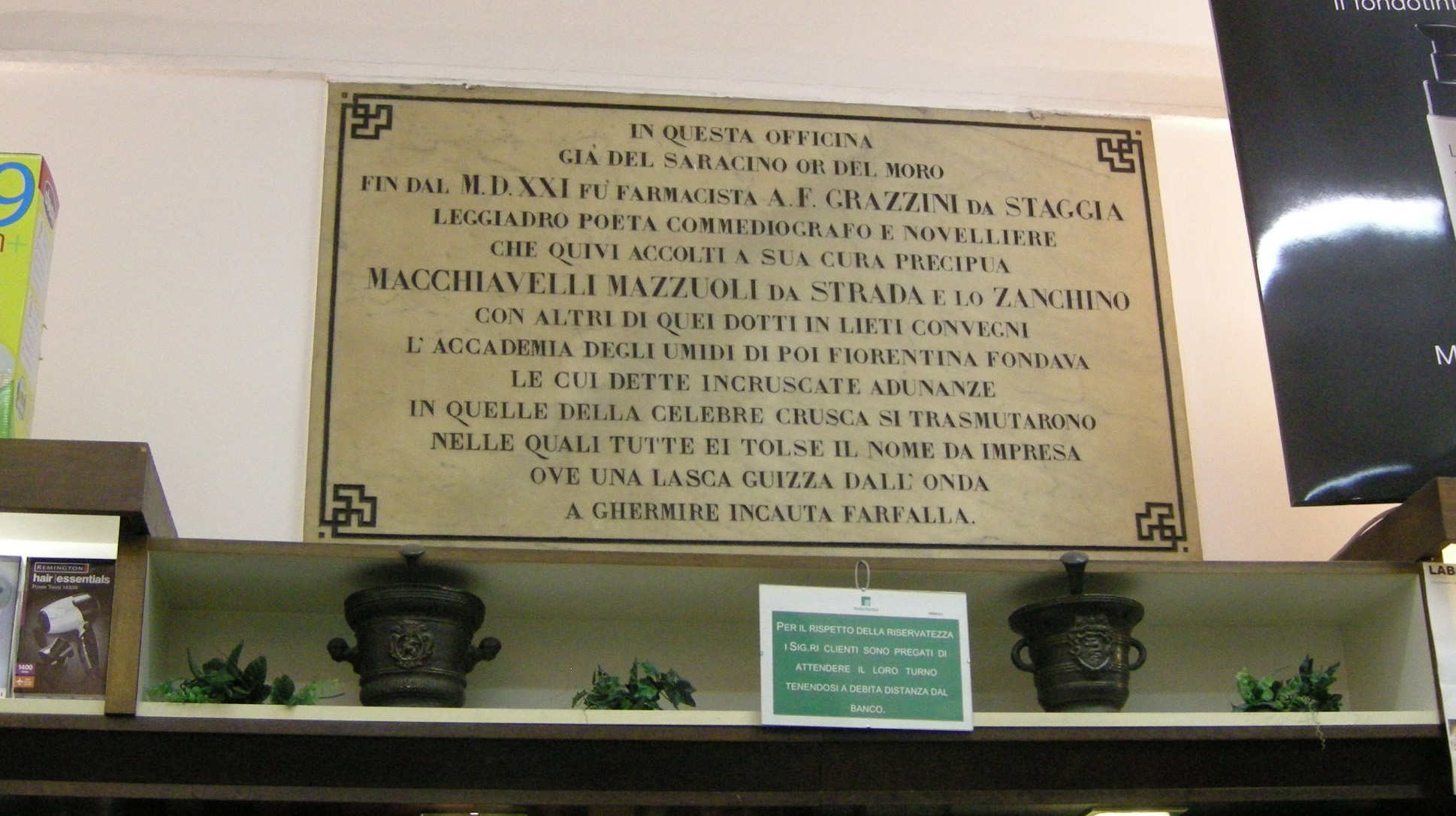
Plaque in the Pharmacy

The pharmacy dates to before the 1500s, and was so named because Arabic pharmaceutical skills were considered pre-eminent at the time. By the 16th century, under the humanist and pharmacist Anton Francesco Grazzini, it became a meeting place for like-minded scholars. In prior centuries, the pharmacy had a collection of 18th-century white ceramic jars with gilded letters, now lost. The 1966 flood further destroyed much of the contents. Today, only the shop windows (from 1905), depicting a turbaned moor's head, and a memorial plaque recall the history. The plaque reads:

In this office, formerly "del Saracino" or "del Moro", until 1521 the pharmacist A.F. Grazzini of Borgo Staggia, elegant poet, author of dramatic comedies, and novelist, who here patronized Machiavelli, Mazzuoli da Strada and lo Zanchino; and with other learned men in convened the Accademia degli Umidi, later called Fiorentina, whose members then formed the celebrated Crusca, in which they took their title for the enterprise as a fish darts from the wave to seize a heedless butterfly.
