= De Officiis =

44 BC philosophical work by Cicero

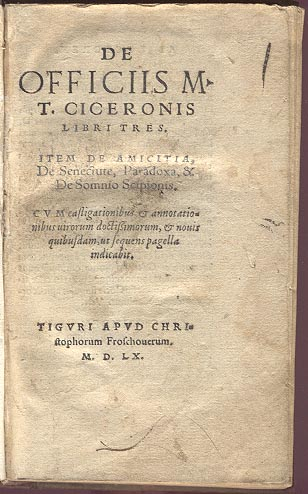
- Title page of De Officiis. Christopher Froschouer – 1560.
- Author: Cicero
- Language: Classical Latin
- Subject: Ethics
- Genre: Philosophy
- Publication date: 44 BC
- Publication place: Roman Republic
- Original text: De Officiis at Latin Wikisource

De Officiis (On Duties, On Obligations, or On Moral Responsibilities) is a 44 BC treatise by Marcus Tullius Cicero divided into three books, in which Cicero expounds his conception of the best way to live, behave, and observe moral obligations. The posthumously published work discusses what is honorable (Book I), what is to one's advantage (Book II), and what to do when the honorable and private gain apparently conflict (Book III). For the first two books Cicero was dependent on the Stoic philosopher Panaetius, but wrote more independently for the third book.

== Background ==
De Officiis was written in October–November 44 BC, in under four weeks. This was Cicero's last year alive, and he was 62 years of age. Cicero was at this time still active in politics, trying to stop revolutionary forces from taking control of the Roman Republic. Despite his efforts, the republican system failed to revive even upon the assassination of Caesar, and Cicero was himself assassinated shortly thereafter.

== Writing ==
De Officiis is written in the form of a letter to his son Cicero Minor, who studied philosophy in Athens. Judging from its form, it is nonetheless likely that Cicero wrote with a broader audience in mind. The essay was published posthumously.

Although Cicero was influenced by the Academic, Peripatetic, and Stoic schools of Greek philosophy, this work shows the influence of the Stoic philosopher Panaetius. Panaetius was a Greek philosopher who had resided in Rome around eighty years previously. He wrote a book On Duties (Greek: Περὶ Καθήκοντος) in which he divided his subject into three parts but had left the work unfinished at the third stage. Although Cicero draws from many other sources, for his first two books he follows the steps of Panaetius fairly closely. The third book is more independent, and Cicero disclaims having been indebted to any preceding writers on the subject. Michael Grant tells us that "Cicero himself seems to have regarded this treatise as his spiritual testament and masterpiece."

Cicero urged his son Marcus to follow nature and wisdom, as well as politics, and warned against pleasure and indolence. Cicero's essay relies heavily on anecdotes, much more than his other works, and is written in a more leisurely and less formal style than his other writings, perhaps because he wrote it hastily. Like the satires of Juvenal, Cicero's De Officiis refers frequently to current events of his time.

== Contents ==
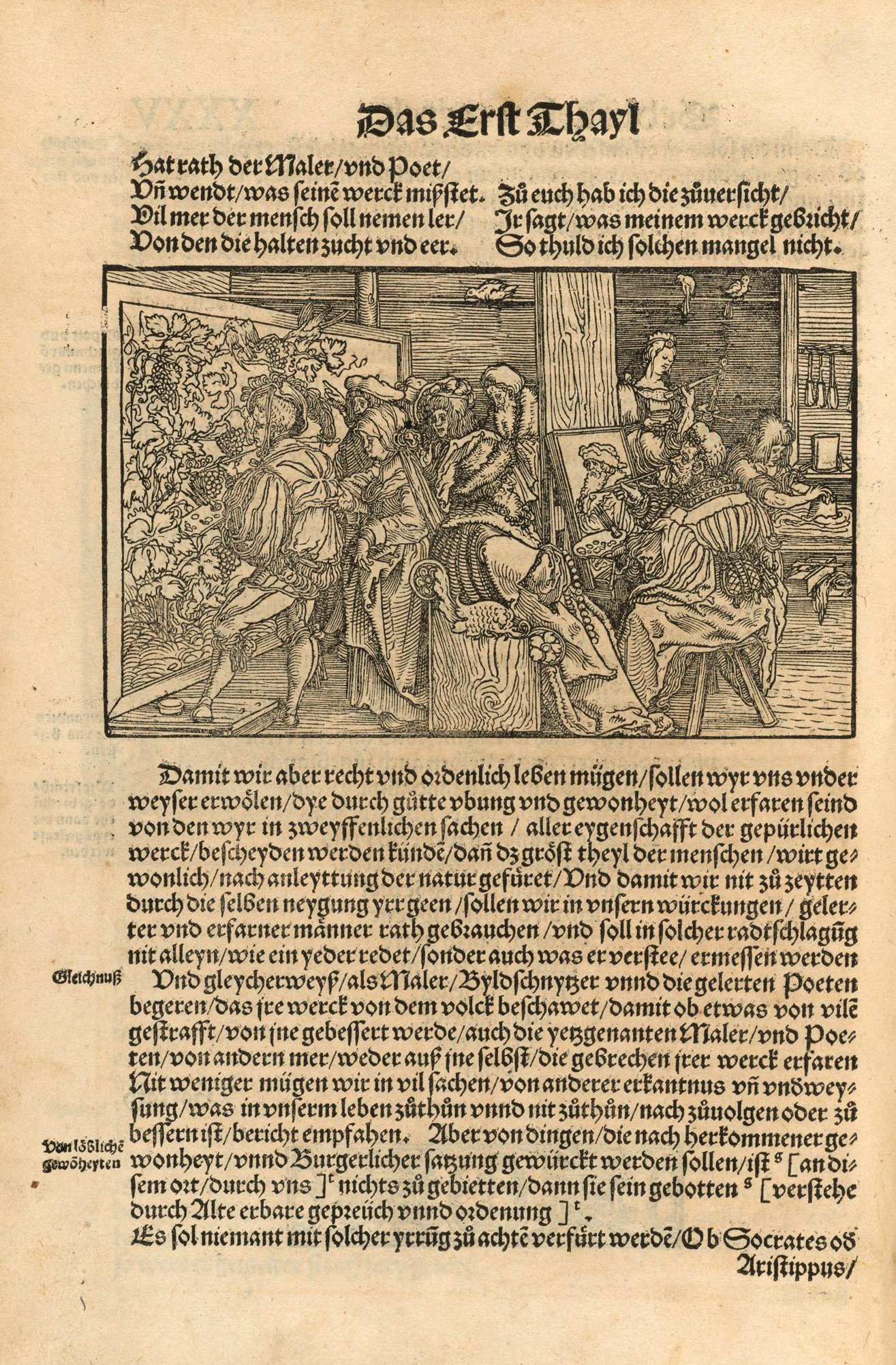
From a German edition – 1531

De Officiis discusses what is honorable (Book I), what is expedient or to one's advantage (Book II), and what to do when the honorable and expedient conflict (Book III). Cicero says they are the same and that they only appear to be in conflict. In Book III, Cicero expresses his own ideas.

=== Book I ===
The first book treats of what is honorable in itself. He shows in what true manner our duties are founded in honor and virtue. The four constituent parts of virtue are truth, justice, fortitude, and decorum, and our duties are founded in the right perception of these.

=== Book II ===
The second book enlarges on those duties which relate to private advantage and the improvement of life. The book focuses on political advancement, and the means employed for the attainment of wealth and power. The honorable means of gaining popularity include generosity, courtesy, and eloquence.

=== Book III ===
The third book discusses the choice to be made when there is an apparent conflict between virtue and expediency. True virtue can never be put in competition with private advantage. Thus nothing should be accounted useful or profitable if not strictly virtuous, and there ought to be no separation of the principles of virtue and expediency.

Cicero proposes some rules for cases of doubt, where seeming utility comes into competition with virtue. He examines in what situations one may seek private gain with honour. He takes his examples from Roman history, such as the case of Marcus Atilius Regulus who was released by the Carthaginians to negotiate a peace, advised the Roman Senate to reject the proposals, and fulfilled his oath by returning to Carthage.

== Themes ==
De Officiis has been characterized as an attempt to define ideals of public behavior. It criticizes the recently overthrown dictator Julius Caesar in several places, and his dictatorship as a whole. Cicero claims that the absence of political rights corrupts moral virtues. Cicero also speaks of a natural law that is said to govern both humans and gods alike.

== Legacy ==
The legacy of De Officiis is profound. Although not a Christian work, in 390 St. Ambrose declared it legitimate for the Church to use (along with everything else Cicero, and the equally popular Roman philosopher Seneca, had written). It became a moral authority during the Middle Ages. Of the Church Fathers, St. Augustine, St. Jerome and even more so St. Thomas Aquinas, are known to have been familiar with it. Illustrating its importance, some 700 handwritten copies remain extant in libraries around the world dating back to before the invention of the printing press. Though this does not surpass the Latin grammarian Priscian's 900 extant handwritten copies, it places De Officiis far above many classical works. Following the invention of the printing press, De Officiis was the third book to be printed—third only to the Gutenberg Bible and Donatus's Ars Minor, which was the first printed book. (Note: "The first printed book was not Gutenberg's famed forty-two-line Bible but rather Donatus's Ars Minor, which Gutenberg, correctly sizing up the market, hoped to sell in class sets to schools.")

Petrarch, the father of humanism and a leader in the revival of Classical learning, championed Cicero. Several of his works build upon the precepts of De Officiis. Prince Peter, Duke of Coimbra, member of the Order of the Garter, translated the treatise to Portuguese in 1437, signal of the wide spread of the work in medieval courts. The Catholic humanist Erasmus published his own edition in Paris in 1501. His enthusiasm for this moral treatise is expressed in many works. The German humanist Philip Melanchthon established De Officiis in Lutheran humanist schools.

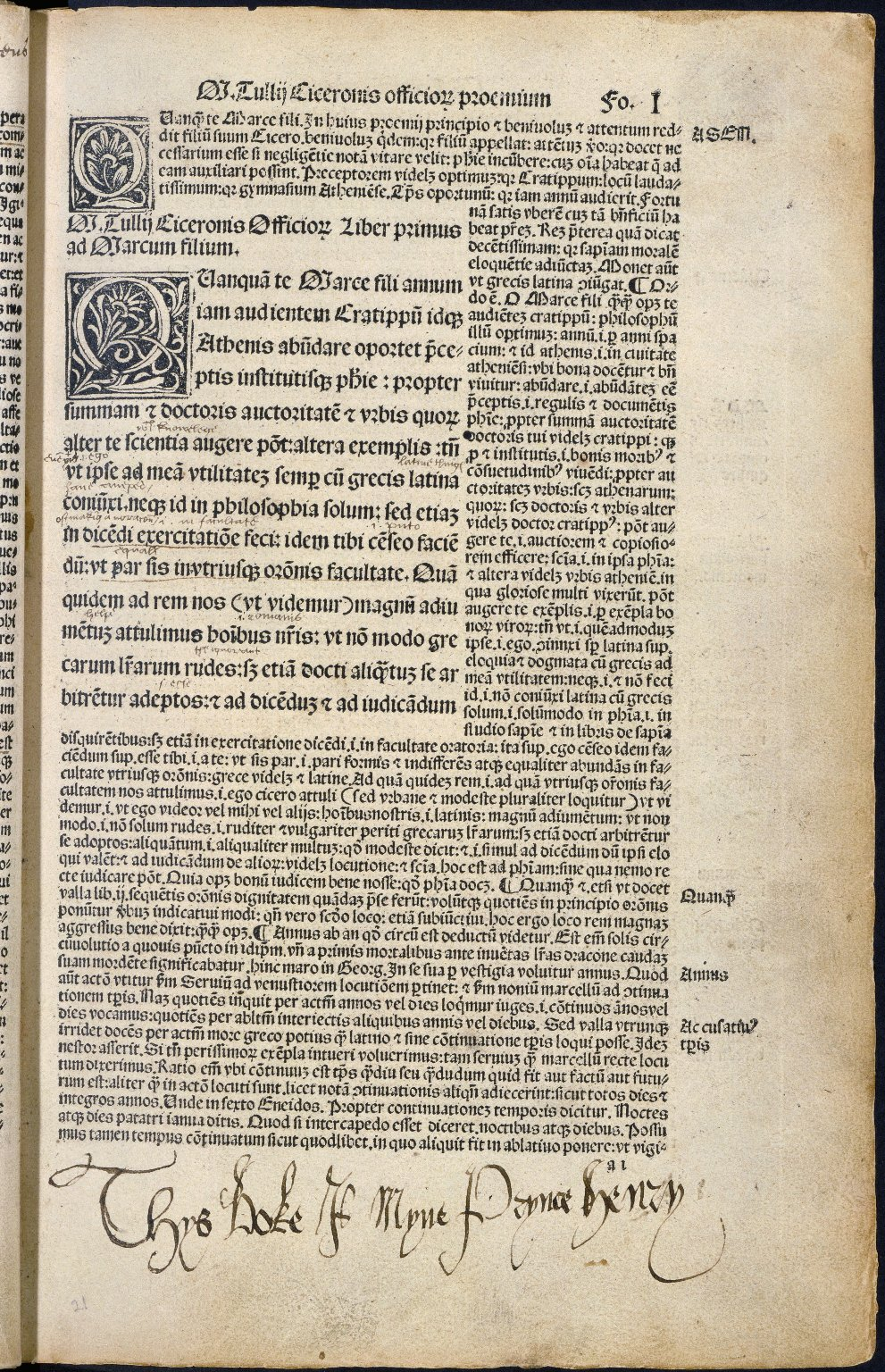
Henry VIII's childhood copy of De Officiis, bearing the inscription "Thys boke is myne" in his hand, from the collection of the Folger Shakespeare Library

T. W. Baldwin said that "in Shakespeare's day De Officiis was the pinnacle of moral philosophy". Sir Thomas Elyot, in his popular Governour (1531), lists three essential texts for bringing up young gentlemen: Plato's works, Aristotle's Ethics, and De Officiis.

In the 17th century it was a standard text at English schools (Westminster and Eton) and universities (Cambridge and Oxford). It was extensively discussed by Hugo Grotius and Samuel von Pufendorf. Grotius drew heavily on De Officiis in his major work, On the Law of War and Peace. It influenced Robert Sanderson and John Locke.

In the 18th century, Voltaire said of De Officiis "No one will ever write anything more wise". Frederick the Great thought so highly of the book that he asked the scholar Christian Garve to do a new translation of it, even though there had been already two German translations since 1756. Garve's project resulted in 880 additional pages of commentary.

In 1885, the city of Perugia was shaken by the theft of an illuminated manuscript of De Officiis from the city's Library Augusta. The chief librarian Adamo Rossi, a well-known scholar, was originally suspected but exonerated after a lengthy administrative and judicial investigation. The culprit in the theft was never found. Suspicion fell on a janitor who a few years later became well-to-do enough to build for himself a fine house. The former janitor's house was nicknamed "Villa Cicero" by residents of Perugia.

The 2002 George Mason Memorial in Washington, D.C., includes De Officiis as an element of the statue of a seated Mason.

De Officiis continues to be one of the most popular of Cicero's works because of its style, and because of its depiction of Roman political life under the Republic.
