= Tommaso Barnabei =

Italian painter

Tommaso Barnabei (sometimes as Tommaso Bernabei), also known as Maso Papacello (c. 1500 in Rome or Cortona – 18 May 1559 in Cortona), was an Italian painter of the Renaissance.

He was a pupil of Luca Signorelli, and aided Giulio Romano at Rome. At about 1523-4 he assisted Giambattista Caporali at the villa of Cardinal Passerini, near Cortona. He painted three pictures, representing an Annunciation, Conception, and Adoration of Magi for the church of Santa Maria del Calcinaio, near Cortona, and finally settled at Perugia, where he died in 1559.

== Other works ==
- History of Rome (Storie di Roma), 1524–1525, fresco, Cortona, Palazzone Passerini.
- Assumption of the Virgin, 1525–1528, oil on wood, Chiesa del Calcinaio, Cortona
- Madonna with Child and Saints, ca. 1527, fresco, Farneta Abbey, Cortona
- Pentecost, ca. 1529, oil on wood, Cathedral of Cortona
- Annunciation, 1532, oil on wood, Museo Civico, Montone
- Ceiling Decorations, ca. 1528–1530, fresco, Eroli Chapel, Cathedral of Spoleto
- Facade Decorations, ca. 1528–1530, fresco, Palazzo Racani Spoleto.
- Madonna col Bambino Benedicente, 1540 ca., fresco, Church of Santa Maria, Cesi, Terni.
- Madonna with Child and Saints, 1543, fresco, Cortona, Chiesa del Calcinaio.
- History of Braccio Fortebracci (Storie di Braccio), 1547–1548, fresco, Sala della Congregazione (Congregational Hall), Palazzo dei Priori in Perugia, now Galleria Nazionale dell'Umbria
