= Lattanzio Pagani =

Italian painter

Lattanzio Pagani (active after 1543, died circa 1582) was an Italian painter of the late-Renaissance or Mannerist period, active mainly in Umbria.

== Biography ==
He was born in Monterubbiano in the province of Fermo, in the region of Marche. He was an artist attached to Cardinal Tiberio Crispo after 1543, and when the Cardinal was papal legate in Umbria in 1545–1548. After 1553, Pagani became a captain in the militia. He later studied law in Perugia, receiving a doctorate in 1567. He became the Bargello in Rome in 1573.

He painted frescoes (circa 1546) for the Frescoes in Palazzo Trinci in Foligno. The art historian Giorgio Vasari documents that Pagani worked during 1543–1544 in painting frescoes in the no longer extant Rocca Paolina of Perugia. He was aided by Cristofano Gherardi. He also painted two altarpieces:

- Santa Margherita Altarpiece (1547-9), painted for the Nunnery of Santa Margherita, but now in the Galleria Nazionale dell'Umbria in Perugia. Pagani is thought to have painted the predella, while the main panel is presumed the work of Organtino di Mariano.
- Santa Maria del Popolo Altarpiece (1548-9), commissioned by Cardinal Crispo for the church of Santa Maria del Popolo, Rome, but now in the National Gallery. Part of the altarpiece was attributed by Vasari to Gherardi.
