= Organtino di Mariano =

Italian painter

Organtino di Mariano Bisconti (active 1529 - 1564) was an Italian painter of the Renaissance period active in Perugia.

He painted the altarpiece of Santa Margherita in Perugia.

He was a pupil of Giovanni Battista Caporali, and worked with him in the church of San Pietro in Perugia. Organtino also worked with Lattanzio Pagani.
