= Petrignano, Assisi =

Petrignano
- Frazione
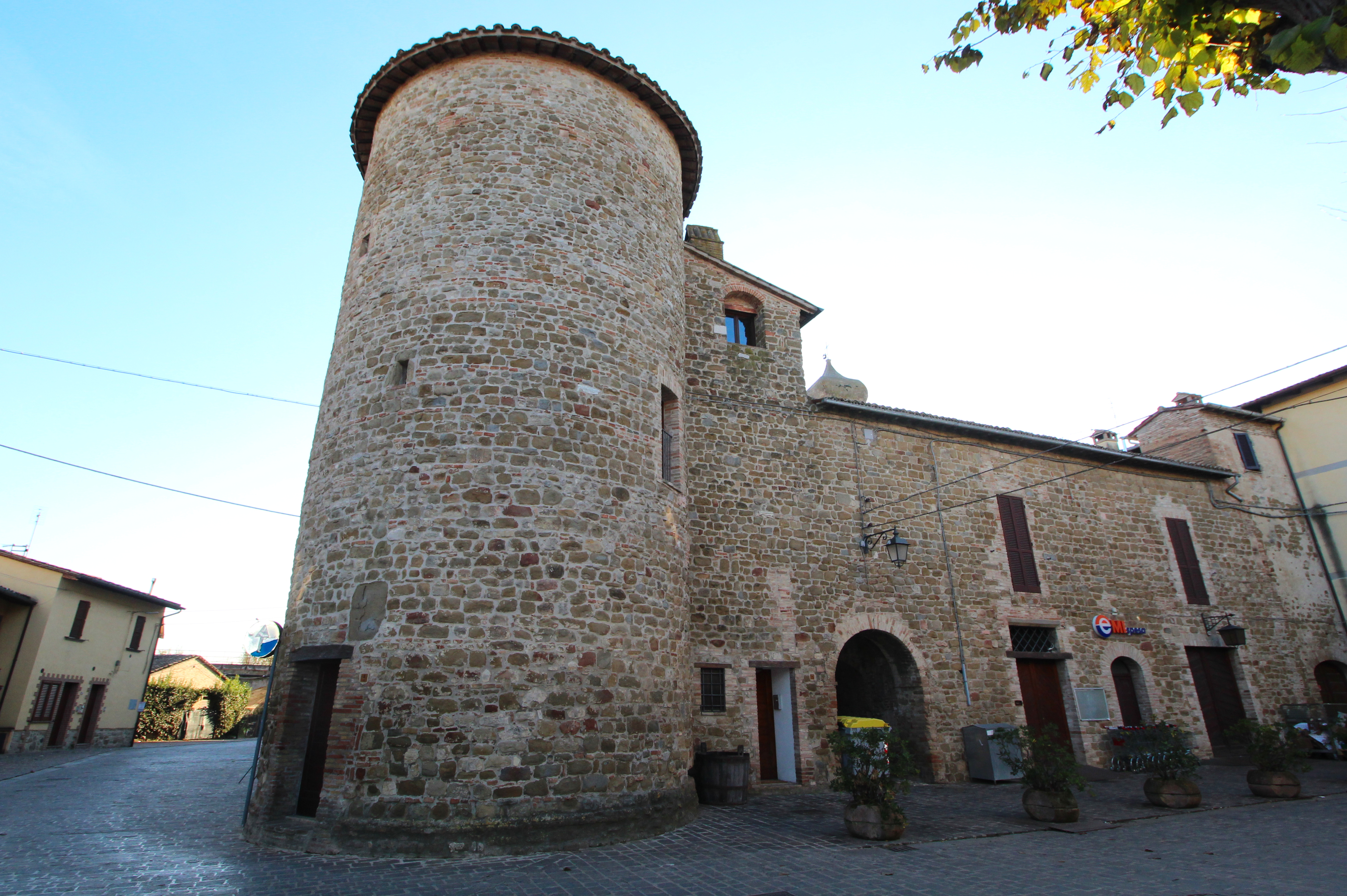
- Petrignano

- Location within Italy
- Coordinates: 43°06′14″N 12°32′11″E
- Country: Italy
- Region: Umbria
- Province: Perugia
- Comune: Assisi
- Elevation: 212 m (696 ft)

Population (2001)
  - Total: 2,536
- Time zone: UTC+1 (CET)
  - Summer (DST): UTC+2 (CEST)
- Postcode: 06081
- Area code: 075

Petrignano is a frazione of the comune of Assisi in the Province of Perugia, Umbria, central Italy. It stands at an elevation of 212 metres above sea level on the right bank of the Chiascio River, c. 8 km east to Assisi. At the time of the Istat census of 2001 it had 2536 inhabitants.

It has a 13th-century castle.

== History ==
The village is home to a 13th-century castle, reflecting its medieval origins. During the medieval period, Assisi and its surrounding areas, including Petrignano, were fortified with castles to defend against invasions and conflicts.

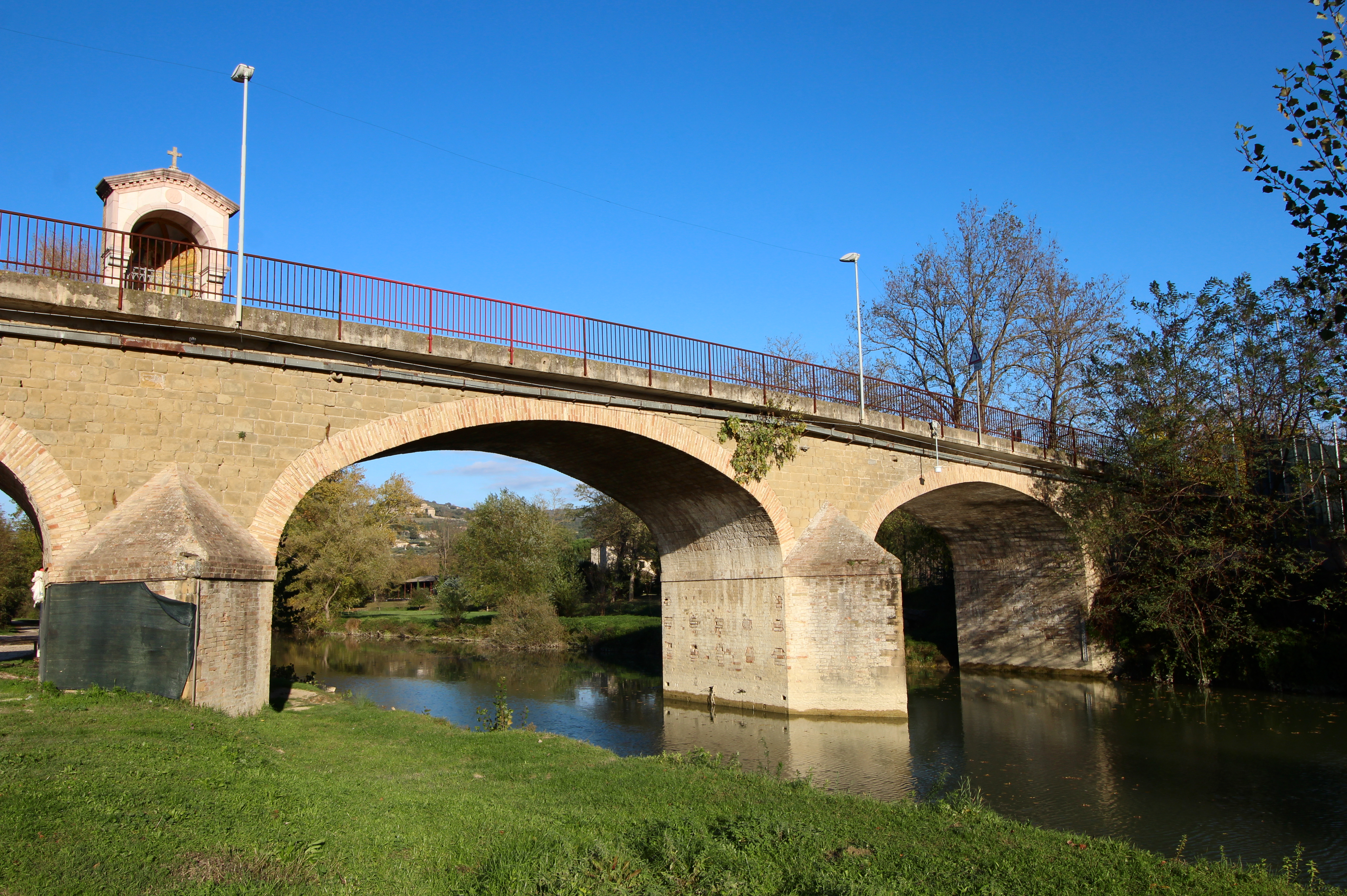
The bridge on the Chiascio river
