= Petrignano =

Petrignano may refer to:

- Petrignano, Assisi
- Petrignano, Castiglione del Lago
