= Vere Chappell =

American philosopher and scholar (1930–2019)

- Born: March 22, 1930; Rochester, New York, U.S.
- Died: January 31, 2019 (aged 88); North Adams, Massachusetts, U.S.
- Spouse: Sheryl Chappell

Education
- Education: Yale University

Philosophical work
- Era: Contemporary philosophy
- Region: Western philosophy
- School: Analytic
- Doctoral students: William Lycan

Vere Claiborne Chappell (March 22, 1930 – January 28, 2019) was an American philosopher and scholar specializing in early modern philosophy, history of philosophy, philosophy of mind and action, and metaphysics.

Chappell was born in Rochester, New York, in 1930, receiving his PhD from Yale University in 1958.

In 2008 a collection of essays was published in honor of his work.

Chappell died in North Adams, Massachusetts, on January 28, 2019, at the age of 88.

== Education ==
- Yale University (1947–53) - BA (1951); MA (1953)
- Universität Heidelberg (1953–54)
- Yale University (1954–57) - PhD (1958)

== Career ==
- Yale University - Assistant in Instruction (1954–55); Instructor (1955–57)
- University of Chicago - Instructor (1957–61); Assistant Professor (1961–63); Associate Professor (1963–68); Professor (1968–70)
- North Central College - Visiting Professor (Summer 1965)
- Indiana University - Visiting Professor (1967)
- University of Illinois, Chicago - Visiting Professor (1967)
- University of Illinois, Urbana - Visiting Professor (1968)
- University of Notre Dame - Visiting Professor (1969)
- University of Southern California - Visiting Professor (1969)
- University of Massachusetts Amherst - Professor (1970–2006); Emeritus (2006–)
- Smith College - Visiting Professor (1973; 1974)
- Mount Holyoke College - Visiting Professor (1982; 1983; 1985; 1988; 1990; 1991; 1992)
- Università per Stranieri di Siena - Exchange Professor (1993)
- Amherst College - Visiting Professor (1996)

== Publications ==
=== Books ===
- The Philosophy of Mind, edited with Introduction (Prentice-Hall, 1962); new ed. (Dover, 1981).
- The Philosophy of David Hume, edited with Introduction (Modern Library, 1963).
- Ordinary Language, edited with Introduction (Prentice-Hall, 1964); new ed. (Dover, 1981).
- Hume, edited with Introduction (Anchor Books, 1966).
- Twenty-five Years of Descartes Scholarship, 1960-1984: A Bibliography, with Willis Doney (Garland, 1987).
- Essays on Early Modern Philosophers: From Descartes and Hobbes to Newton and Leibniz, edited with Introductions. 12 Vols. (Garland, 1992).
- The Cambridge Companion to Locke, edited with Introduction (Cambridge University Press, 1994).
- Descartes's Meditations, edited with Introduction (Rowman & Littlefield, 1997).
- Locke, edited with Introduction (Oxford University Press, 1998).
- Hobbes and Bramhall on Liberty and Necessity, edited with Introduction (Cambridge University Press, 1999).
