= Innatism =

Belief that the human mind is born with knowledge

In the philosophy of mind, innatism is the view that the mind is born with already-formed ideas, knowledge, and beliefs. The opposing doctrine, that the mind is a tabula rasa (blank slate) at birth and all knowledge is gained from experience and the senses, is called empiricism.

== Difference from nativism ==
Innatism and nativism are generally synonymous terms referring to the notion of preexisting ideas in the mind. However, more specifically, innatism refers to the philosophy of Descartes, who assumed that God or a similar being or process placed innate ideas and principles in the human mind. The innatist principles in this regard may overlap with similar concepts such as natural order and state of nature, in philosophy.

Nativism represents an adaptation of this, grounded in the fields of genetics, cognitive psychology, and psycholinguistics. Nativists hold that innate beliefs are in some way genetically programmed in our mind—they are the phenotypes of certain genotypes that all humans share in common. Nativism is a modern view rooted in innatism. The advocates of nativism are mainly philosophers who also work in the field of cognitive psychology or psycholinguistics: most notably Noam Chomsky and Jerry Fodor (although the latter adopted a more critical attitude toward nativism in his later writings). The nativist's general objection against empiricism is still the same as was raised by the rationalists; the human mind of a newborn child is not a tabula rasa but is equipped with an inborn structure.

== History ==
Although individual human beings vary in many ways (culturally, ethnically, linguistically, and so on), innate ideas are the same for everyone everywhere. For example, the philosopher René Descartes theorized that knowledge of God is innate in everybody. Philosophers such as Descartes and Plato were rationalists. Other philosophers, most notably the empiricists, were critical of innate ideas and denied they existed. The debate over innate ideas is central to the conflict between rationalists (who believe certain ideas exist independently of experience) and empiricists (who believe knowledge is derived from experience). Many believe the German philosopher Immanuel Kant synthesized these two early modern traditions in his philosophical thought.

=== Plato ===
Plato argues that if there are certain concepts that we know to be true but did not learn from experience, then it must be because we have an innate knowledge of it and that this knowledge must have been gained before birth. In Plato's Meno, he recalls a situation where his mentor Socrates questioned a slave boy about geometry. Though the slave boy had no previous experience with geometry, he was able to answer correctly. Plato reasoned that this was possible because Socrates' questions sparked the innate knowledge of math the boy had from birth.

=== René Descartes ===
Descartes (1596–1650) conveys the idea that innate knowledge or ideas is something inborn such as one would say, that a certain disease might be 'innate' to signify that a person might be at risk of contracting such a disease. He suggests that something that is 'innate' is effectively present from birth and while it may not reveal itself then, is more than likely to present itself later in life. Descartes’ comparison of innate knowledge to an innate disease, whose symptoms may show up only later in life, unless prohibited by a factor like age or puberty, suggests that if an event occurs prohibiting someone from exhibiting an innate behaviour or knowledge, it doesn't mean the knowledge did not exist at all but rather it wasn't expressed – they were not able to acquire that knowledge. In other words, innate beliefs, ideas and knowledge require experiences to be triggered or they may never be expressed. Experiences are not the source of knowledge as proposed by John Locke, but catalysts to the uncovering of knowledge.

=== Gottfried Wilhelm Leibniz ===
Gottfried Wilhelm Leibniz (1646–1716) contends that we are born with certain innate ideas, the most identifiable of these being mathematical truisms. The idea that 1 + 1 = 2 is evident to us without the necessity for empirical evidence. Leibniz argues that empiricism can show us that concepts are true in the present; the observation of one apple and then another in one instance, and in that instance only, leads to the conclusion that one and another equals two. However, the suggestion that one and another will always equal two requires an innate idea, as that would be a suggestion of things unwitnessed.

Leibniz called such concepts as mathematical truisms "necessary truths". Another example of such may be the phrase, "What is, is" or "It is impossible for the same thing to be and not to be". Leibniz argues that such truisms are universally assented to (acknowledged by all to be true); this being the case, it must be due to their status as innate ideas. Often some ideas are acknowledged as necessarily true but are not universally assented to. Leibniz would suggest that this is simply because the person in question has not become aware of the innate idea, not because they do not possess it. Leibniz argues that empirical evidence can serve to bring to the surface certain principles that are already innately embedded in our minds. This is similar to needing to hear only the first few notes to recall the rest of the melody.

=== John Locke ===
The main antagonist to the concept of innate ideas is John Locke (1632–1704), a contemporary of Leibniz. Locke argued that the mind is in fact devoid of all knowledge or ideas at birth; it is a blank sheet or tabula rasa. He argued that all our ideas are constructed in the mind via a process of constant composition and decomposition of the input that we receive through our senses. Locke, in An Essay Concerning Human Understanding, which he published in 1690 under his own name, contends that the concept of universal assent, in fact, proves nothing, except perhaps that everyone is in agreement. In short universal assent proves that there is universal assent and nothing else. Locke goes on to suggest that, in fact, there is no universal assent. Even a phrase such as "What is, is" is not universally assented to; infants and severely mentally disabled adults do not generally acknowledge this truism. Locke also attacks the idea that an innate idea can be imprinted on the mind without the owner realizing it. For Locke, such reasoning would allow one to conclude the absurd: "All the Truths a Man ever comes to know, will, by this account, be, every one of them, innate." To return to the musical analogy, we may not be able to recall the entire melody until we hear the first few notes, but we were aware of the fact that we knew the melody and that upon hearing the first few notes we would be able to recall the rest.

Locke ends his attack on innate ideas by arguing that the mind is a tabula rasa or "blank slate", and that all ideas come from experience. All our knowledge is founded in sensory experience. Essentially, the same knowledge thought to be a priori by Leibniz is, according to Locke, the result of empirical knowledge, which has a lost origin [been forgotten] in respect to the inquirer. However, the inquirer is not cognizant of this fact; thus, he experiences what he believes to be a priori knowledge.

1. The theory of innate knowledge is excessive. Even innatists accept that most of our knowledge is learned through experience, but if that can be extended to account for all knowledge, we learn color through seeing it, so therefore, there is no need for a theory about an innate understanding of color.
2. No ideas are universally held. Do we all possess the idea of God? Do we all believe in justice and beauty? Do we all understand the law of identity? If not, it may not be the case that we have acquired these ideas through impressions/experience/social interaction.
3. Even if there are some universally agreed statements, it is just the ability of the human brain to organize learned ideas/words, that is, innate. An "ability to organize" is not the same as "possessing propositional knowledge" (e.g., a computer with no saved files has all the operations programmed in but has an empty memory).

=== Noam Chomsky ===
In his Meno, Plato raises an important epistemological quandary: how is it that we have certain ideas that are not conclusively derivable from our environments? Linguistics scholar Noam Chomsky (born 1928) has taken this problem as a philosophical framework for the scientific inquiry into innatism. His linguistic theory, which derives from 18th-century classical-liberal thinkers such as Wilhelm von Humboldt (1767–1835), attempts to explain in cognitive terms how we can develop knowledge of systems which are said, by supporters of innatism, to be too rich and complex to be derived from our environment.

It is claimed one such example is our linguistic faculty. According to Chomsky, our linguistic systems contain a systemic complexity which supposedly could not be empirically derived: the environment seems too poor, variable and indeterminate, to explain the extraordinary ability to learn complex concepts possessed by very young children. Essentially, their accurate grammatical knowledge cannot have originated from their experiences as their experiences are not adequate. It follows that humans must be born with a universal innate grammar, which is determinate and has a highly organized directive component, and enables the language learner to ascertain and categorize language heard into a system. Chomsky contends that the ability to learn how to properly construct sentences or know which sentences are grammatically incorrect is an ability gained from innate knowledge. Noam Chomsky cites as evidence for this theory, the apparent invariability, according to his views, of human languages at a fundamental level. In this way, linguistics may provide a window into the human mind, and establish scientific theories of innateness which otherwise would remain merely speculative.

One implication of Chomsky's innatism, if correct, is that at least a part of human knowledge consists in cognitive predispositions, which are triggered and developed by the environment, but not determined by it. Chomsky suggests that we can look at how a belief is acquired as an input-output situation. He supports the doctrine of innatism as he states that human beliefs gathered from sensory experience are much richer and complex than the experience itself. He asserts that the extra information gathered is from the mind itself as it cannot solely be from experiences. Humans derive excess amount of information from their environment so some of that information must be pre-determined.

== See also ==
- Anamnesis
- Bouba/kiki effect
- Concept
- Fitra
- Idea
- Instinct
- Nature versus nurture
- Platonism
- Psychological nativism
- Tabula rasa
- Rationalism
- Theory of Forms
- Idealism
- Qualia
- Hard problem of consciousness
