= Tabula rasa =

Idea of being born empty of mental content

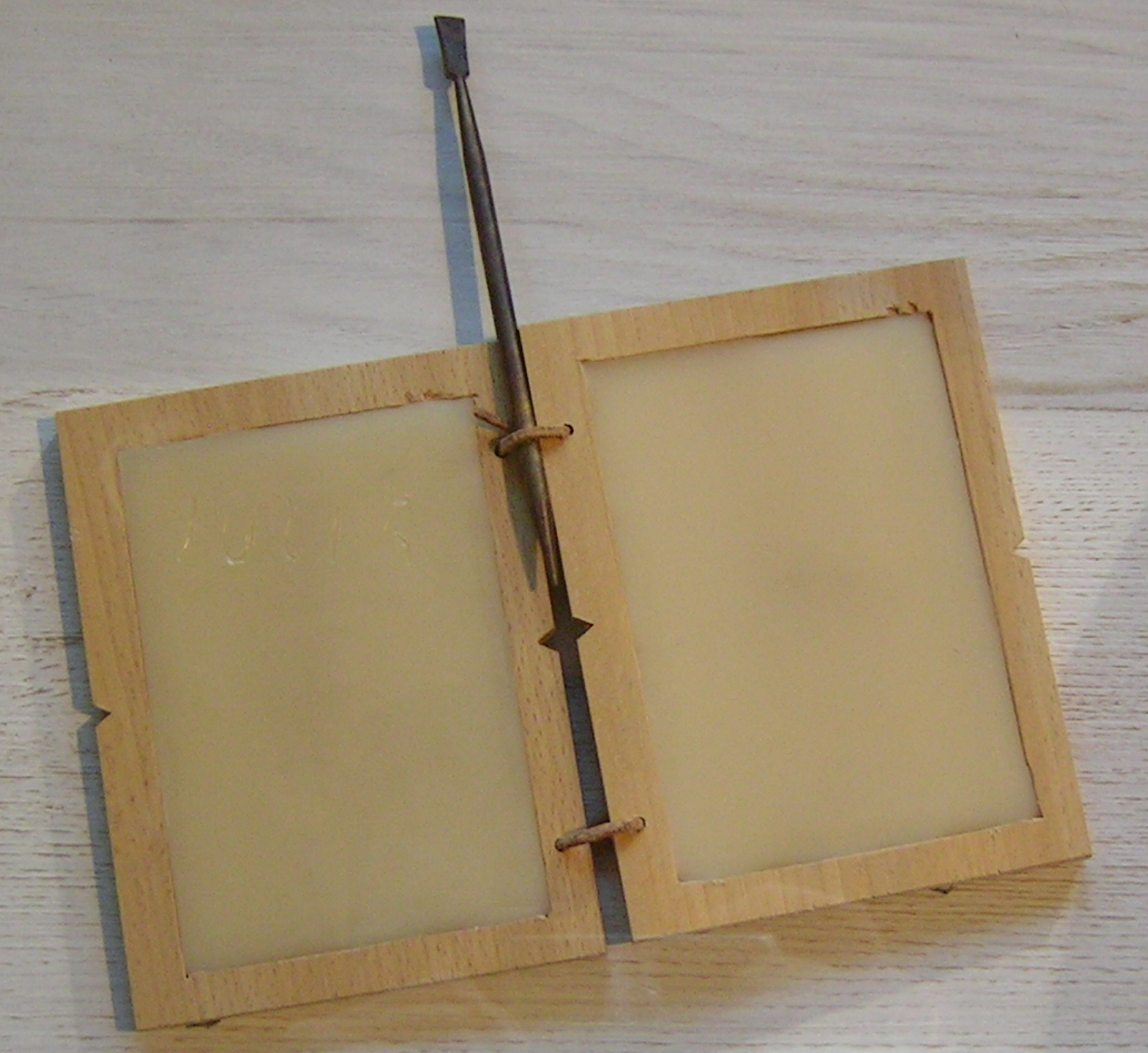
Roman tabula, or wax tablet, with stylus

Tabula rasa (/ˈtæb.(j)ə.lə ˈrɑː.sə, -.zə, ˈreɪ.-/; Latin for "blank slate") is the idea of individuals being born empty of any built-in mental content, so that all knowledge comes from later perceptions or sensory experiences. Proponents typically form the extreme "nurture" side of the nature versus nurture debate, arguing that humans are born without any "natural" psychological traits and that all aspects of one's personality, social and emotional behaviour, knowledge, or sapience are later imprinted by one's environment onto the mind as one would onto a wax tablet. This idea is the central view posited in the theory of knowledge known as empiricism. Empiricists disagree with the doctrines of innatism or rationalism, which hold that the mind is born already in the possession of specific knowledge or rational capacity.

== Etymology ==
Tabula rasa is a Latin phrase often translated as clean slate in English and originates from the Roman tabula, a wax-covered tablet used for notes, which was blanked (rasa) by heating the wax and then smoothing it. This roughly equates to the English term "blank slate" (or, more literally, "erased slate") which refers to the emptiness of a slate prior to it being written on with chalk. Both may be renewed repeatedly, by melting the wax of the tablet or by erasing the chalk on the slate.

== Philosophy ==
=== Ancient Greek philosophy ===
In Western philosophy, the concept of tabula rasa can be traced back to the writings of Aristotle who writes in his treatise De Anima (Περί Ψυχῆς, 'On the Soul') of the "unscribed tablet." In one of the more well-known passages of this treatise, he writes that:

Haven't we already disposed of the difficulty about interaction involving a common element, when we said that mind is in a sense potentially whatever is thinkable, though actually it is nothing until it has thought? What it thinks must be in it just as characters may be said to be on a writing tablet on which as yet nothing stands written: this is exactly what happens with mind.

This idea was further evolved in Ancient Greek philosophy by the Stoic school. Stoic epistemology emphasizes that the mind starts blank, but acquires knowledge as the outside world is impressed upon it. The doxographer Aetius summarizes this view as "When a man is born, the Stoics say, he has the commanding part of his soul like a sheet of paper ready for writing upon." Diogenes Laërtius attributes a similar belief to the Stoic Zeno of Citium when he writes in Lives and Opinions of Eminent Philosophers that:

Perception, again, is an impression produced on the mind, its name being appropriately borrowed from impressions on wax made by a seal; and perception they divide into comprehensible and incomprehensible: Comprehensible, which they call the criterion of facts, and which is produced by a real object, and is, therefore, at the same time conformable to that object; Incomprehensible, which has no relation to any real object, or else, if it has any such relation, does not correspond to it, being but a vague and indistinct representation.

=== Ibn Sina (11th century) ===
In the 11th century, the theory of tabula rasa was developed more clearly by Ibn Sina (Avicenna). The Internet Encyclopedia of Philosophy describes him arguing that "human intellect at birth resembled a tabula rasa, a pure potentiality that is actualized through education and comes to know". Thus, according to Ibn Sina, knowledge is attained through "empirical familiarity with objects in this world from which one abstracts universal concepts," which develops through a "syllogistic method of reasoning; observations lead to propositional statements, which when compounded lead to further abstract concepts." He further argued that the intellect itself "possesses levels of development from the static/material intellect, that potentiality can acquire knowledge to the active intellect, the state of the human intellect at conjunction with the perfect source of knowledge."

=== Ibn Tufail (12th century) ===
In the 12th century, the Andalusian-Islamic philosopher and novelist, Ibn Tufail (known as Abubacer or Ebn Tophail in the West) demonstrated the theory of tabula rasa as a thought experiment through his Arabic philosophical novel, Hayy ibn Yaqdhan, in which he depicts the development of the mind of a feral child "from a tabula rasa to that of an adult, in complete isolation from society" on a desert island, through experience alone.

The Latin translation of his philosophical novel, entitled Philosophus Autodidactus, published by Edward Pococke the Younger in 1671, had an influence on John Locke's formulation of tabula rasa in An Essay Concerning Human Understanding.

=== Aquinas (13th century) ===
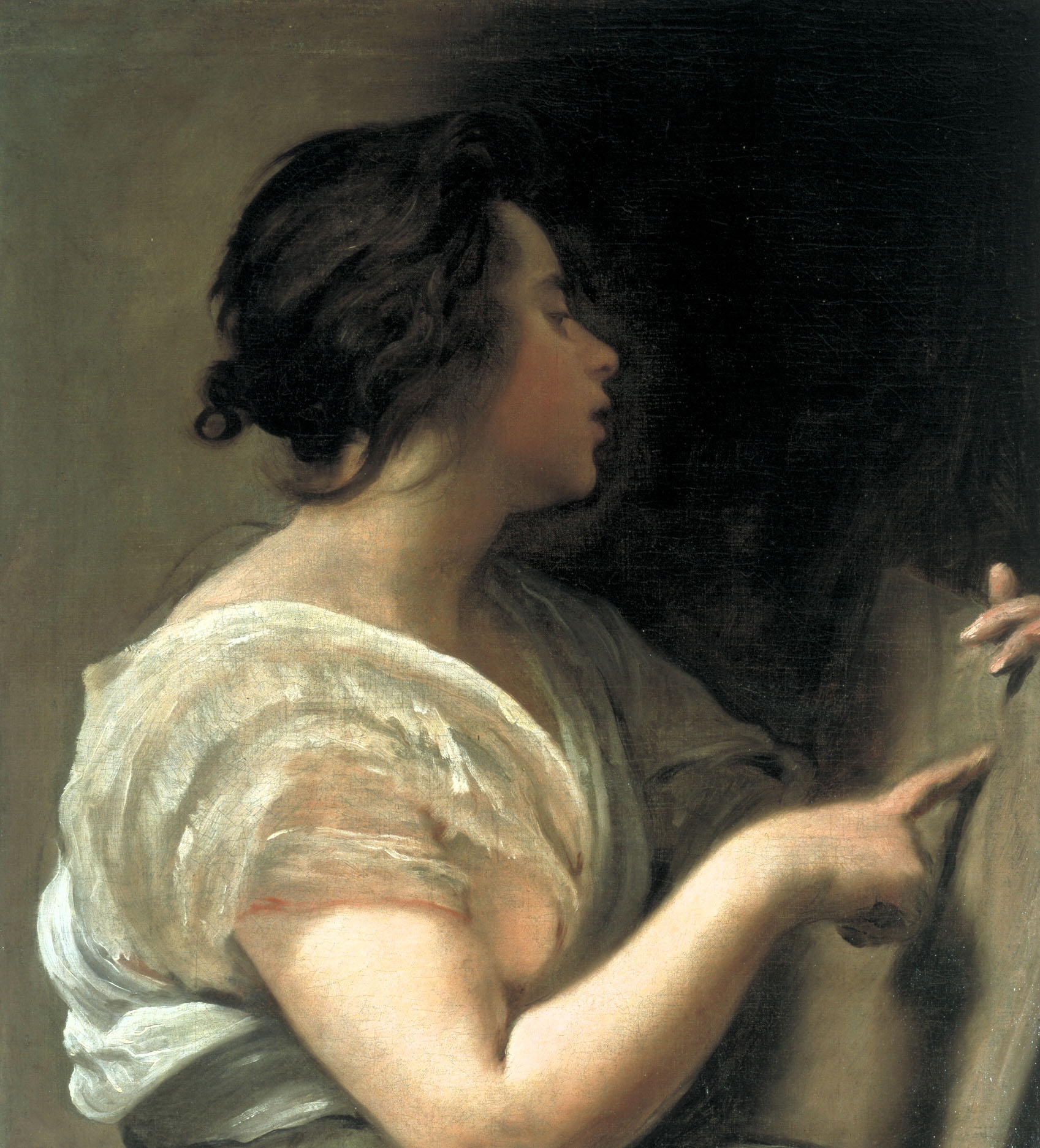
Female Figure (Sibyl with Tabula Rasa) by Diego Velázquez, c. 1648

In the 13th century, St. Thomas Aquinas brought the Aristotelian and Avicennian notions to the forefront of Christian thought. These notions sharply contrasted with the previously-held Platonic notions of the human mind as an entity that pre-existed somewhere in the heavens, before being sent down to join a body here on Earth (cf. Plato's Phaedo and Apology, as well as others). St. Bonaventure (also 13th century) was one of the fiercest intellectual opponents of Aquinas, offering some of the strongest arguments toward the Platonic idea of the mind.

=== Descartes (17th century) ===
Descartes, in his work The Search for Truth by Natural Light, summarizes an empiricist view in which he uses the words table rase, in French; in the following English translation, this was rendered tabula rasa:

All that seems to me to explain itself very clearly if we compare children's imagination to a tabula rasa on which our ideas, which resemble portraits of each object taken from nature, should depict themselves. The senses, the inclinations, our masters and our intelligence, are the various painters who have the power to execute this work; and amongst them, those who are least adapted to succeed in it, i.e., the imperfect senses, blind instinct, and foolish nurses, are the first to mingle themselves with it. There finally comes the best of all, intelligence, and yet it is still requisite for it to have an apprenticeship of several years, and to follow the example of its masters for long, before daring to rectify a single one of their errors. In my opinion this is one of the principal causes of the difficulty we experience in attaining to true knowledge. For our senses really perceive that alone which is most coarse and common; our natural instinct is entirely corrupted; and as to our masters, although there may no doubt be very perfect ones found amongst them, they yet cannot force our minds to accept their reasoning before our understanding has examined it, for the accomplishment of this end pertains to it alone. But it is like a clever painter who might have been called upon to put the last touches on a bad picture sketched out by prentice hands, and who would probably have to employ all the rules of his art in correcting little by little first a trait here, then a trait there, and finally be required to add to it from his own hand all that was lacking, and who yet could not prevent great faults from remaining in it, because from the beginning the picture would have been badly conceived, the figures badly placed, and the proportions badly observed.

=== Locke (17th century) ===
The modern idea of the theory is attributed mostly to John Locke's expression of the idea in Essay Concerning Human Understanding, particularly using the term "white paper" in Book II, Chap. I, 2. In Locke's philosophy, tabula rasa was the theory that at birth the (human) mind is a "blank slate" without rules for processing data, and that data is added and rules for processing are formed solely by one's sensory experiences. The notion is central to Lockean empiricism; it serves as the starting point for Locke's subsequent explication (in Book II) of simple ideas and complex ideas.

As understood by Locke, tabula rasa meant that the mind of the individual was born blank, and it also emphasized the freedom of individuals to author their own soul. Individuals are free to define the content of their character—but basic identity as a member of the human species cannot be altered. This presumption of a free, self-authored mind combined with an immutable human nature leads to the Lockean doctrine of "natural" rights. Locke's idea of tabula rasa is frequently compared with Thomas Hobbes's viewpoint of human nature, in which humans are endowed with inherent mental content—particularly with selfishness.

=== Freud (19th century) ===
The concept of Tabula rasa can be constructed from Sigmund Freud's psychoanalysis. Freud argued that the psyche was largely formed by socialization, not biology or genealogy. (see Oedipus complex). In Freud's schema of psycho-sexual development, the conflicting drives imprinted by the parents (the id versus the superego) produce ego, and that in spite of his neuroses, the analysand would discuss matters in a non-adversarial manner. The clinician would simply pose questions to the patient about his neuroses. Exposure to such questions would inculcate the patient's secondary defenses against the neuroses, helping him shed 'substitutive satisfactions,' sadomasochism. Freud's theories implied that humans are largely products of their socialization. In Freudian psychoanalysis, ones' neuroses are agitated until transference neuroses are projected onto the psychoanalyst. Freud posited the individual as a blank slate with an imprint of regressive characteristics through socialization.

== Science ==
=== Psychology and neurobiology ===
Psychologists and neurobiologists have shown evidence that initially, the entire cerebral cortex is programmed and organized to process sensory input, control motor actions, regulate emotion, and respond reflexively (under predetermined conditions). These programmed mechanisms in the brain subsequently act to learn and refine the ability of the organism. Psychological research has shown that — in contrast to written language — the brain is "hard-wired" at birth to acquire spoken language, something argued by both psychologist Steven Pinker and by the universal grammar theory of Noam Chomsky.

There have been claims by a minority in psychology and neurobiology, however, that the brain is tabula rasa only for certain behaviours. For instance, with respect to one's ability to acquire both general and special types of knowledge or skills, Michael Howe argued against the existence of innate talent. There also have been neurological investigations into specific learning and memory functions, such as Karl Lashley's study on mass action and serial interaction mechanisms.

Important evidence against the tabula rasa model of the mind comes from behavioural genetics, especially twin and adoption studies (see below). These indicate strong genetic influences on personal characteristics such as IQ, alcoholism, gender identity, and other traits. Critically, multivariate studies show that the distinct faculties of the mind, such as memory and reason, fractionate along genetic boundaries. Cultural universals such as emotion and the relative resilience of psychological adaptation to accidental biological changes also support basic biological mechanisms in the mind.

==== Social pre-wiring hypothesis ====
Twin studies have resulted in important evidence against the tabula rasa model of the mind, specifically, of social behaviour. The social pre-wiring hypothesis (also informally known as "wired to be social") refers to the ontogeny of social interaction. The theory questions whether there is a propensity to socially oriented action already present before birth. Research in the theory concludes that newborns are born into the world with a unique genetic wiring to be social.

Circumstantial evidence supporting the social pre-wiring hypothesis can be revealed when examining newborns' behaviour. Newborns, not even hours after birth, have been found to display a preparedness for social interaction. This preparedness is expressed in ways such as their imitation of facial gestures. This observed behaviour cannot be attributed to any current form of socialization or social construction. Rather, newborns most likely inherit to some extent social behaviour and identity through genetics.

Principal evidence for this theory is uncovered by examining twin pregnancies. The main argument is, if there are social behaviours that are inherited and developed before birth, then one should expect twin fetuses to engage in some form of social interaction before they are born. Thus, ten fetuses were analyzed over a period of time using ultrasound techniques. Using kinematic analysis, the results of the experiment were that the twin fetuses would interact with each other for longer periods and more often as the pregnancies went on. Researchers were able to conclude that the performance of movements between the co-twins were not accidental but specifically aimed.

The social pre-wiring hypothesis was proven correct:

The central advance of this study is the demonstration that 'social actions' are already performed in the second trimester of gestation. Starting from the 14th week of gestation twin fetuses plan and execute movements specifically aimed at the co-twin. These findings force us to predate the emergence of social behaviour: when the context enables it, as in the case of twin fetuses, other-directed actions are not only possible but predominant over self-directed actions.

=== Computer science ===
In artificial intelligence, tabula rasa refers to the development of autonomous agents with a mechanism to reason and plan toward their goal, but no "built-in" knowledge-base of their environment. Thus, they truly are a blank slate.

In reality, autonomous agents possess an initial data-set or knowledge-base, but this cannot be immutable or it would hamper autonomy and heuristic ability. Even if the data-set is empty, it usually may be argued that there is a built-in bias in the reasoning and planning mechanisms. Either intentionally or unintentionally placed there by the human designer, it thus negates the true spirit of tabula rasa.

A synthetic (programming) language parser (LR(1), LALR(1) or SLR(1), for example) could be considered a special case of a tabula rasa, as it is designed to accept any of a possibly infinite set of source language programs, within a single programming language, and to output either a good parse of the program, or a good machine language translation of the program, either of which represents a success, or, alternately, a failure, and nothing else. The "initial data-set" is a set of tables which are generally produced mechanically by a parser table generator, usually from a BNF representation of the source language, and represents a "table representation" of that single programming language.

AlphaZero achieved superhuman performance in chess and shogi using self-play and tabula rasa reinforcement learning, meaning it had no access to human games or hard-coded human knowledge about either board game, only the rules of the games.

== See also ==
- Epigenetics
- Hereditarianism
- Innatism
- Pu (Daoism)
- Veil of ignorance
