= Antonio Francesco Grazzini =

Italian writer, poet and playwright (1503–1584)

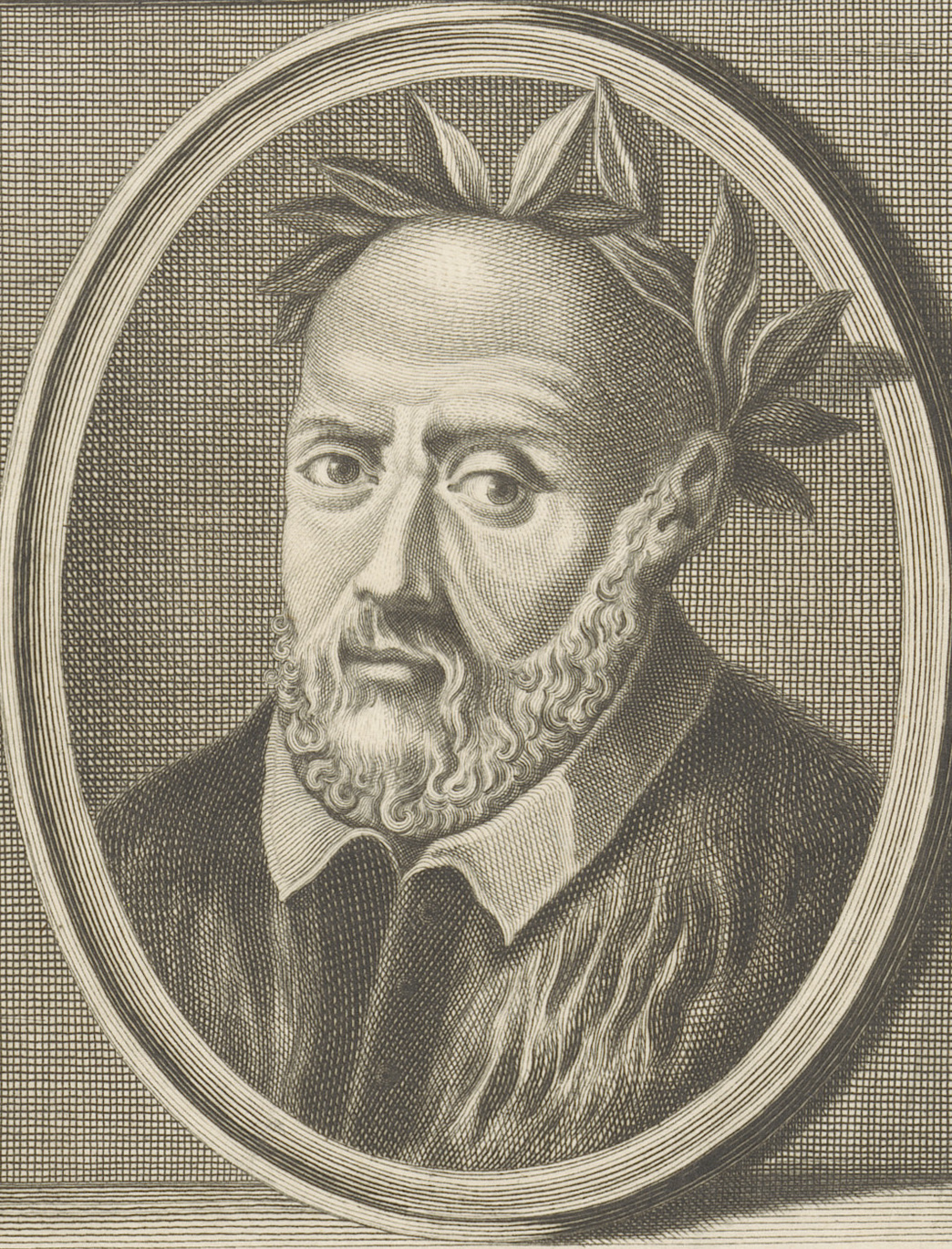
- Antonio Francesco Grazzini
- Born: March 22, 1503; Florence, Republic of Florence
- Died: 18 February 1584 (aged 80); Florence, Grand Duchy of Tuscany
- Resting place: San Pier Maggiore, Florence
- Occupations: Writer; Scholar
- Parent(s): Grazzino Grazzini and Lucrezia Grazzini (née de' Santi)

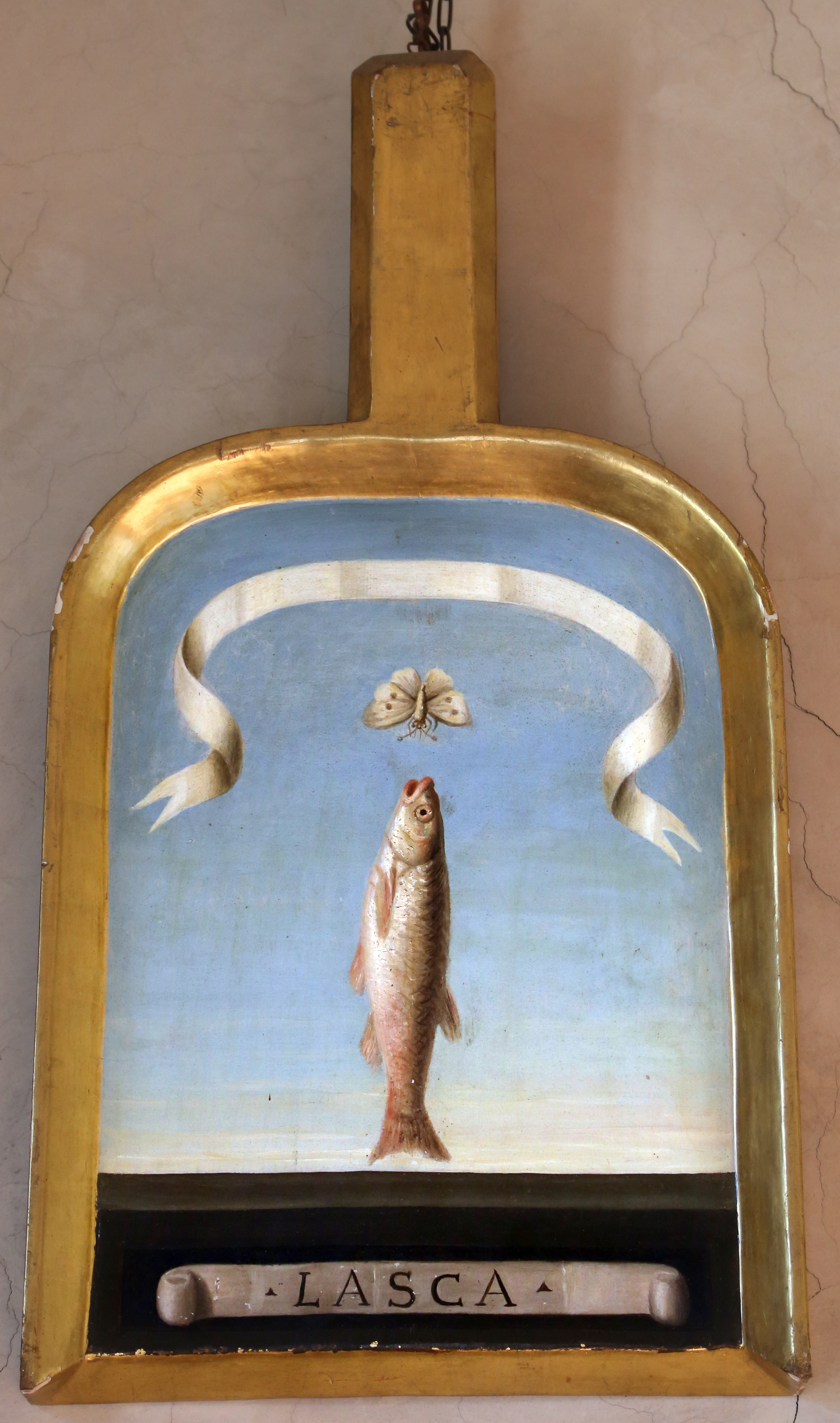
The shovel of Anton Francesco Grazzini (il Lasca) at the Accademia della Crusca

Antonio Francesco Grazzini or Antonfrancesco Grazzini (March 22, 1503 – February 18, 1584) was an Italian Renaissance author.

== Biography ==
He was born in Florence or in Staggia Senese (he wrote of himself: Io sono a Staggia, ch'è la patria mia, e de' miei primi l'antica magione…) of a good family, but there is no record of his upbringing and education. He probably began to practise as an apothecary as a youth; and owned the then famous Farmacia del Moro near the Cathedral. In 1540 he was among the founders of the Accademia degli Umidi, which was soon renamed Accademia Fiorentina. He later took a leading role in the establishment of the more famous Accademia della Crusca, which published his Vocabulario of words accepted as the purest Italian. To both societies he was known as Il Lasca or Leuciscus, a pseudonym which is still frequently substituted for his name.

Grazzini was temperamental, his life consequently enlivened or disturbed by various literary quarrels. His Umidi brethren expelled him for a time, because of his ruthless criticism of the Arameans, a party of academicians led by Giambattista Gelli who maintained that the Florentine language was derived from Hebrew, Aramaic, or some other branch of the Semitic. He was readmitted in 1566, when his friend Salviati was consul.

II Lasca ranks as one of the great masters of Tuscan prose. His style is flexible and idiomatic, but without affectation. It has the tone of popular speech, whilst retaining a flavour of academic culture.

== Main works ==
- Le Cene (1549), a collection of stories in the manner of Boccaccio, and a number of prose comedies. One of the stories is The Story of Doctor Manente, translated and with an introduction by D.H. Lawrence (G. Orioli, 1929). Sem Benelli's play The Jester's Supper is inspired by a short story from Grazzini's Le Cene (I, 3).
- La Spiritata (1561)
- I Parentadi
- La Arenga
- La Sibilla
- La Pinzochera
- L'Arzigogolo

A number of miscellaneous poems, a few letters and Four Orations to the Cross complete the list of Grazzini's works.

He also edited the works of Francesco Berni, and collected Tutti I trionfi, larri, mascherate o canti carnascialeschi, andati per Firenze dal tempo del Magnifico Lorenzo vecchio de' Medici fino all'anno 1559 (the latter influenced Goethe's "Faust"). In 1868 Adamo Rossi published in his Ricerche per le biblioteche di Perugia three novelle by Grazzini, from a manuscript of the 16th century in the Comunale of Perugia; and in 1870 a small collection of those poems which have been left unpublished by previous editors appeared at Poggibonsi, Alcune poesie inedite.
