= Giulio Caporali =

Italian painter and architect

Giulio Caporali (Perugia, active 1540) was an Italian painter and architect of the Renaissance.

He was the son and pupil of Giovanni Battista, also known as Bitti and perhaps erroneously as Benedetto, and who was a painter at Perugia, and a pupil of Perugino. Giulio was an architect of the Panicale Cathedral.
