= John W. Yolton =

American historian of philosophy

- Born: October 31, 1921; Birmingham, Alabama, U.S.
- Died: November 3, 2005 (aged 84); New Brunswick, New Jersey, U.S.
- Education: University of Cincinnati; University of California, Berkeley; Balliol College, Oxford
- Occupation: Historian of philosophy
- Employer: Rutgers University
- Spouse: Jean Yolton

John W. Yolton (1921–2005) was an American historian of philosophy.

He taught at Rutgers University from 1978 to 1992, and was a dean from 1978 to 1985. He authored or edited 15 books, several of which were about John Locke.

== Early life ==
Yolton was born in 1921 in Birmingham, Alabama. He earned a bachelor's degree from the University of Cincinnati, a master's degree from the University of California, Berkeley, and a DPhil from Balliol College, Oxford.

== Career ==
Yolton taught at Johns Hopkins University, the University of Baltimore, Princeton University, Kenyon College, the University of Maryland, and York University. He was a professor in the Philosophy department at Rutgers University from 1978 to 1992, and a dean from 1978 to 1985.

Yolton was the author or editor of 15 books, several of which were about John Locke.

== Personal life and death ==
Yolton had a wife, Jean. He died on November 3, 2005, in New Brunswick, New Jersey.

== Selected works ==
- Yolton, John W. (1956). Locke and The Way of Ideas. Oxford, U.K.: Oxford University Press. OCLC 459188873.
- Yolton, John W. (1994). Philosophy, Religion, and Science in the Seventeenth and Eighteenth Centuries. Rochester, New York: University of Rochester Press. ISBN 9781878822413. OCLC 638801866.
- Yolton, John W. (2004). The Two Intellectual Worlds of John Locke: Man, Person, and Spirits in the Essay. Ithaca, New York: Cornell University Press. ISBN 9780801442902. OCLC 912339324.
