= Paul Althaus =

German Lutheran theologian (1888–1966)

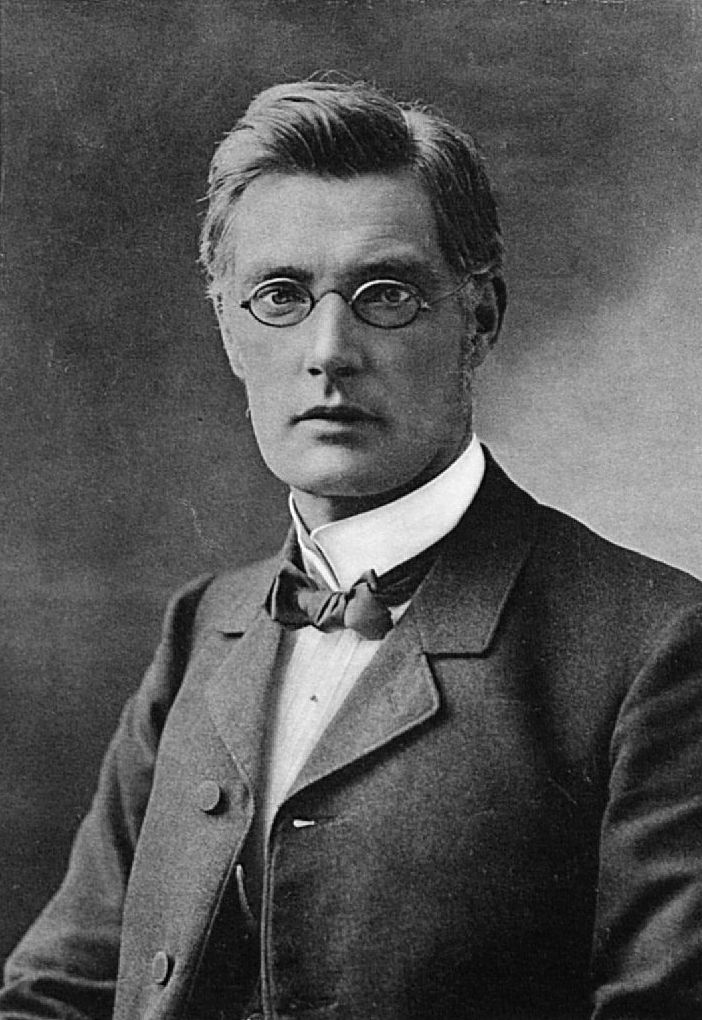
Image of Paul Althaus

Paul Althaus (4 February 1888 – 18 May 1966) was a German Lutheran theologian. He was born in Obershagen in the Province of Hanover, and he died in Erlangen. He held various pastorates from 1914 to 1925, when he was appointed associate professor of practical and systematic theology at the University of Göttingen, becoming full professor two years later. Althaus was moderately critical of Lutheran Orthodoxy and evangelical-leaning Neo-Lutheranism. He termed it a “mistake” to “defend the authenticity and infallibility of the Bible.”

In 1933, when a professor of theology at the University of Erlangen, and probably the leading Luther authority of his day, he welcomed the emergence to power of Adolf Hitler - "Our Protestant churches have greeted the turning point of 1933 as a gift and miracle of God".

== Life ==
Paul Althaus, son of the Lutheran theologian Adolf Paul Johannes Althaus (1861-1925), studied Lutheran theology in Tübingen and Göttingen. In Tübingen he was especially influenced by Adolf Schlatter. In Göttingen his doctorate was supervised by Eduard Stange, and he passed his habilitation there in 1913/'14. In the First World War he served as a military chaplain. From 1919 Althaus was an ordinary professor in systematic theology at Rostock University. In 1925 he took up the chair in systematic and New Testament theology in Erlangen. From the summer semester of 1929, he was an honorary member of the Christian student union of Erlangen. He exclusively taught systematic theology until 1932, after which he also taught New Testament theology. Althaus held the position of university preacher from 1932 to 1964. Between 1926 and 1964, he was president of the Luther-Gesellschaft.

Having welcomed the National Socialist rise to power as a 'divine gift and miracle' in 1933, he nonetheless served after the end of the Second World War as the inaugural head of the internal university denazification commission. However, on 31 January 1947, after his involvement in National Socialism became public, he was removed from his post by the American military government in the course of its own denazification process. In 1948 he was once again granted permission to teach in the University of Erlangen, where he worked until his retirement in 1966. In 1953, he was elected as a member of the Bavarian Academy of Sciences and Humanities.

The executor for his literary estate was the historian and political theorist Gotthard Jasper.

== Theology ==
=== Original Revelation ===
With his doctrine of 'original' or 'fundamental' revelation, Althaus opposed the Christocentric theology of revelation of dialectical theology, especially that of Karl Barth, who had denied any self-disclosure of God outside Christ. For Althaus God reveals himself outside of Jesus Christ in, for example, human existence, in fate, in history, in nature and in humanity's consciousness of truth and sin. Original revelation is however subordinated to the revelation of salvation in Christ, owing to its being tainted by the attributes of the sinful world.

=== Doctrine of Creation ===
Althaus treated institutions such as marriage, family, work, the economy, the people (das Volk), state, church and society as originally ordained by God as part of God's good creation. They are not to be understood (in Lutheran terms) as mere orders of preservation but as orders of creation, because God acts continually through them. The orders are the ways God draws the world towards God's kingdom and secures human common life. For this reason the orders bind humanity: it is obligated towards them in its freedom for responsible decision. Althaus' view of the people (das Volk) as an order of creation led to his contentious declarations about National Socialism and Judaism.

=== Luther ===
Althaus is considered one of the foremost experts of Martin Luther's theology. In particular his works The Theology of Martin Luther and The Ethics of Martin Luther remain standard works in the field.

=== Capital Punishment ===
Althaus called for the introduction of the death penalty after the passing of the German Constitution of 1949.

== Nazism & Antisemitism ==
Like many Protestant theologians Althaus welcomed the National Socialists' rise to power. From 1936 he gradually distanced himself from the Third Reich, partly because of the increasing hostility to the church of Hitler's policies. Already in Althaus' writings before 1933, however, there were antisemitic views such as the idea of 'the people' (das Volk) as one of the orders of creation (in Luther's sense). In 1933 Althaus and his colleague Werner Elert drafted a report for the Erlangen Faculty of Theology on a planned 'Aryan paragraph' for the Protestant Reich Church (Reichskirche). Althaus and Elert called in their report for the exclusion of 'nihilist' candidates for official church positions. 'Nihilists' who already held appointments were however - despite demands from the German Christians - not to be removed from office.

== Honors ==
In 1959 Paul Althaus was awarded the Bavarian Order of Merit, an honor instituted in 1957. It is awarded 'as a mark of respectful and grateful recognition for outstanding contributions to the Free State of Bavaria and the Bavarian people'.

== Works ==
- Luther und das Deutschtum [Luther and Germanness], Leipzig 1917
- Kirche und Volkstum. Der völkische Wille im Lichte des Evangeliums [Church and Nationality: the National Will in the Light of the Gospel], Gütersloh 1928
- Grundriß der Ethik [Outline of Ethics], Erlangen 1931 (earlier edition: Leitsätze)
- Die deutsche Stunde der Kirche [The Church's German Period], Göttingen 1934
- Obrigkeit und Führertum. Wandlungen des evangelischen Staatsethos in Deutschland [Authority and Führerism: Changes in the Evangelical State Ethos in Germany], Gütersloh 1936
- Der Christenglaube und das Sterben [Christian Faith and Death], Gütersloh 1941
- Vom Sterben und vom Leben [On Death and Life], Gütersloh 1950 (earlier edition: Der Christenglaube und das Sterben)
- Die Theologie Martin Luthers [The Theology of Martin Luther], Gütersloh 1962
- The Theology of Martin Luther (tr. Robert Schultz) Fortress Press 1966
- Die Christliche Wahrheit. Lehrbuch der Dogmatik [Christian Truth: Textbook of Dogmatics], 8th edition, Gütersloh 1969
- Die Ethik Martin Luthers [The Ethics of Martin Luther] Gütersloh 1965
- The Ethics of Martin Luther (tr. Robert Schulz) Fortress Press 1972
