= Doctor of Divinity =

Holder of an advanced academic degree in divinity

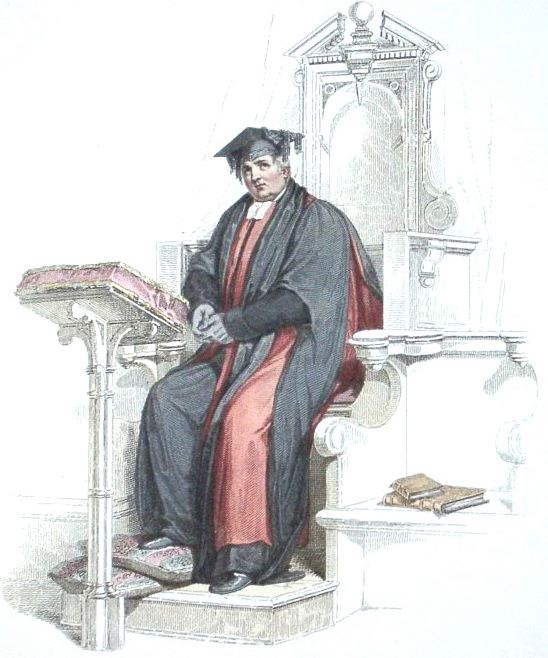
An Oxford Doctor of Divinity, in Convocation habit.

A Doctor of Divinity (DD or DDiv; Latin: Doctor Divinitatis) is the holder of an advanced academic degree in divinity (i.e., Christian theology and ministry or other theologies). The term is more common in the English-speaking world than elsewhere. In the United Kingdom and Ireland, the DD is usually a higher doctorate conferred upon a religious scholar of standing and distinction, usually for accomplishments beyond the PhD or ThD level. In the United States, the DD is generally an honorary degree. In Catholic universities, faculties of theology usually grant the degree of Doctor of Sacred Theology (STD), but the DD may be awarded as an honorary degree.

== Doctor of Divinity by country or church ==
=== Great Britain and Ireland ===
In the United Kingdom and Ireland, the DD is a higher doctorate conferred by universities upon a religious scholar of standing and distinction, usually for accomplishments beyond the PhD level. Typically, an academic candidate will submit a collection of work which has been previously published in a peer-reviewed context and pay an examination fee. The university then assembles a committee of academics, both internal and external, who review the work submitted and decide on whether the candidate deserves the doctorate based on the submission. Most universities restrict candidacy to graduates or academic staff of several years' standing.

At the University of Oxford, doctors of divinity are ranked first in "academic precedence and standing", while at the University of Cambridge they rank ahead of all other doctors in the "order of seniority of graduates". Traditionally, bishops of the Church of England and the Church of Ireland were granted a DD from one of the Anglican universities (Oxford, Cambridge, or Dublin), or as a Lambeth degree conferred by authority of the Archbishop of Canterbury.

=== United States ===
In the United States, most doctors of divinity hold a degree conferred honoris causa by a church-related college, seminary, or university to recognize the recipient's achievements as a minister of religion. For example, Martin Luther King Jr. graduated as a Ph.D. in systematic theology from Boston University in 1955 and subsequently received honorary doctor of divinity degrees from the Chicago Theological Seminary (1957), Boston University (1959), Wesleyan College (1964), and Springfield College (1964). Billy Graham, who received honorary Doctor of Divinity degrees from The King's College and the University of North Carolina at Chapel Hill, was regularly addressed as "Dr. Graham", though his highest earned degree was a Bachelor of Arts degree in anthropology from Wheaton College.

Under federal law, a 1974 judgement accepted expert opinion that an "honorary doctor of divinity is a strictly religious title with no academic standing. Such titles may be issued by bona fide churches and religious denominations, such as plaintiff Universal Life Church, so long as their issuance is limited to a course of instruction in the principles of the church or religious denomination". However, under the California Education Code, "an institution owned, controlled, and operated and maintained by a religious organization lawfully operating as a nonprofit religious corporation pursuant to Part 4 (commencing with Section 9110) of Division 2 of Title 1 of the Corporations Code" that offers "instruction... limited to the principles of that religious organization, or to courses offered pursuant to Section 2789 of Business and Professions Code" may confer "degrees and diplomas only in the beliefs and practices of the church, religious denomination, or religious organization" so long as "the diploma or degree is limited to evidence of completion of that education"; institutions "shall not award degrees in any area of physical science", while

any degree or diploma granted under this subdivision shall contain on its face ... a reference to the theological or religious aspect of the degree's subject area ... a degree awarded under this subdivision shall reflect the nature of the degree title, such as "associate of religious studies," "bachelor of religious studies," "master of divinity," or "doctor of divinity".

In a 1976 interview with Morley Safer of the TV newsmagazine 60 Minutes, Universal Life Church founder Kirby J. Hensley professed that the church's honorary doctor of divinity degree was "...just a little piece of paper. And it ain't worth anything, you know, under God's mighty green Earth—you know what I mean?—as far as value." In 2006, Universal Life Church minister Kevin Andrews advised potential degree recipients not to misrepresent the title as an educational achievement to employers, recommending instead that it would be appropriate to list such credentials "under the heading of Titles, Awards, or Other Achievements" on résumés.

As of 2009, 20 U.S. states and Puerto Rico had some form of exemption provision under which religious institutions can grant religious degrees without accreditation or government oversight. (Note: The places in the U.S. that have some form of exemption provision under which religious institutions can grant religious degrees without accreditation or government oversight are Arizona, California, Florida, Georgia, Hawaii, Indiana, Iowa, Louisiana, Maryland, Minnesota, Missouri, Montana, New Mexico, North Carolina, Puerto Rico, South Dakota, South Carolina, Utah, Virginia, Washington, and Wisconsin.)

=== Roman Catholic Church ===
In the pontifical university system, a holder of the highest earned degree in Catholic theology is styled "Doctor of Sacred Theology" (in Latin, Sacrae Theologiae Doctor, abbreviated STD).

== Contrast with other religious degrees ==
A doctor of divinity should not be confused with a Doctor of Theology (Th.D.), the holder of a research doctorate in theology is awarded by universities and divinity. However, many universities award a Ph.D. rather than a Th.D. to graduates of higher-level religious studies programs. A Doctor of Sacred Theology (STD) holds another research doctorate, in particular awarded by Catholic pontifical universities and faculties. A Doctor of Ministry (D.Min.) holds another doctorate-level religious degree, which is a professional doctorate rather than a research doctorate.

== The Doctor and Student ==
Christopher St. Germain's book The Doctor and Student (1528) describes a dialogue between a Doctor of Divinity and a law student in England containing the grounds of those laws together with questions and cases concerning the equity thereof.

== See also ==
- Bachelor of Divinity
- Doctor of the Church
- Master of Divinity
- Lambeth degree

== Bibliography ==
- Jackman, Ian, ed. (2007). Con Men: Fascinating Profiles of Swindlers and Rogues from the Files of the Most Successful Broadcast in Television History. New York: Simon and Schuster. ISBN 978-1-4165-9319-5.
- St. Germain, Christopher; Muchall, William (1886). The Doctor and Student, Or, Dialogues Between a Doctor of Divinity and a Student in the Laws of England: Containing the Grounds of Those Laws Together with Questions and Cases Concerning the Equity Thereof. Cincinnati: R. Clarke.
