= Althaus =

Althaus is a surname. Notable people with the surname include:

- Dieter Althaus (born 1958), German politician, Minister-President of Thuringia
- Johannes Althusius (1557–1638), also known as Johannes Althaus, German Calvinist philosopher and theologian
- Marcella Althaus-Reid, Argentine professor
- Adolf Paul Johannes Althaus, theologian
- Kenneth Althaus, U.S. Army, general during World War II
- Ernst Freiherr von Althaus, one of the world's first flying aces
- Urs Althaus, Swiss actor
