= Werner Elert =

- Born: Werner August Friedrich Immanuel Elert; 19 August 1885; Heldrungen in the Prussian
- Died: 21 November 1954 (aged 69); Erlangen, Bavaria, Germany
- Occupations: Lutheran theologian and professor

Werner August Friedrich Immanuel Elert (19 August 1885 – 21 November 1954) was a German Lutheran theologian and professor of both church history and systematic theology at the University of Erlangen-Nuremberg. His writings in the fields of Christian dogmatics, ethics, and history have had great influence on modern Christianity in general and modern Lutheranism in particular.

== Biography ==
Elert was born on 19 August 1885 in the town of Heldrungen in the Prussian Province of Saxony (present-day Thuringia), but he grew up in northern Germany. The Elert family had originally come from Rarfin in Pomerania, near Kolberg on the Baltic Sea. They belonged to the "Old Lutherans" who had rejected the 1817 Prussian Union of Churches. Elert's parents were August Elert and Friederike, née Graf, Elert. After attending the Realgymnasium in Harburg and the Gymnasium in Husum, he studied theology, philosophy, history, German literature, psychology and law in Breslau, Erlangen, and Leipzig. He earned doctorates in philosophy and theology at Erlangen.

After working as a tutor for a short time in Livonia, he served as a pastor from 1912 to 1919 in Seefeld, Pomerania. During World War I he served as a military chaplain on several fronts.

In 1919 Elert became director of the Old-Lutheran Theological Seminary in Breslau. In 1923 he was appointed to the chair of church history at the Friedrich-Alexander University Erlangen (now called the University of Erlangen-Nuremberg). With the death of Philip Bachman in 1932, he was appointed to the chair of systematic theology. In the academic year 1926/27 he was elected rector of the university, and in 1928–29 and 1935–43 he served as the dean of the theological faculty. Throughout his years in Erlangen, he was active in the Evangelical Lutheran Church in Bavaria. Elert frequently participated in ecumenical meetings, including the first World Lutheran Conference (where he delivered a paper) and the Second Assembly of the Lutheran World Federation in 1952. In 1927 he gave a major address ("The Call to Unity") at the Lausanne Conference, the first meeting of the "Faith and Order" ecumenical movement.

Elert retired in 1953. He died in Erlangen on 21 November 1954 in his 70th year, due to complications from stomach cancer.

In 1912 Elert married Annemarie (née Froböss, b. 1892), who was the daughter of church official Georg Froböss. They had three children: two sons, both of whom died on the Eastern front in World War II, and one daughter, who later married a Lutheran pastor. The Elert house in Erlangen (Hindenburgstrasse 44) is now a study center for theology students ("Werner-Elert-House") that is owned by the Evangelical Lutheran Church in Bavaria.

== Theological Work ==
Elert's scholarly life can be divided into five periods. In the first of these periods (1910–21), he devoted himself to the philosophy of history and to a defense of the Christian faith vis-a-vis modern philosophy and theology. In the second period (1922–32), he worked on a two-volume study of Lutheranism. The third period (1932–40), which coincided with the regime of Adolf Hitler, was devoted to issues in dogmatics and matters of church and state. The fourth period (1940–49) was marked by his study of Lutheran ethics. In the final period of his life (1950–54), he worked on issues in the history of Christian dogma, particularly relating to Eastern Orthodox christology and eucharistic fellowship.

His first major work, Der Kampf um das Christentum [the struggle over Christianity], published in 1921, offers a critique of the synthesis that developed in the nineteenth century between liberal Protestant theology (especially through the influence of Immanuel Kant, Georg Hegel, and Friedrich Schleiermacher) and modern German "culture" (Kultur). As such, the book provides a critical perspective on these thinkers as well as many others. In Elert's view, modern theology must return to an independent position that maintains its critical distance from all influences that are foreign to the biblical witness to Jesus Christ. Elert was convinced that modern Western culture is in a state of decline (cf. Oswald Spengler) and stands under the judgment of God. The final outcome of any attempt to maintain a synthesis between Christian theology and modern culture "would be the death of the former." "Only when Christianity becomes entirely separate again for a moment, i.e., entirely free from the present 'culture,' will it demonstrate its power for producing a new thing, something it has done more than once in its history." Christian theology will only flourish when it maintains its "diastasis" from modernity. If Christianity is not disentangled "from a decaying culture," it will be "dragged down into the whirlpool." Following earlier theologians in the Erlangen tradition (e.g., F. H. R. Frank, Ludwig Ihmels), Elert stressed the importance of understanding the connection between the historic biblical witness to Christ and the immediacy and "certainty" of the individual Christian's faith in God through the gospel.

Elert's call for the "diastasis" of Christianity from modern thought also impacted some of his later writings. For example, in his Morphologie des Luthertums [the structure of Lutheranism], he presupposed a confessional "dynamism" of Lutheranism, "which, as a basic structural fact, is given to the historical changes themselves.” In his final, unfinished work on the christology of Theodore of Pharan, Elert highlighted the relationship between the dogma of the ancient church and the biblical image of Christ in order to show, contrary to the thesis of Adolph von Harnack, that Christian dogma is not the foreign intrusion of Greek metaphysics into the original gospel, but rather it is a necessary "given," grounded in the gospel and liturgical witness to Christ.

The second period of Elert's scholarly work began with the research and writing of a brief outline of Lutheran teaching. Two years after the publication of the first edition, this little exercise in Lutheran systematic theology was revised and expanded. Part One of the book ("The Struggle with God") describes the human experience of freedom and fate [Schicksal], in which the latter concept refers to "the product of all the factors which shape our lives, other than the will to be free". Here, Elert stresses the fundamental opposition between God and humanity, which is experienced by human beings as a limitation to their knowledge, as an awareness of their moral failure before God (their guilt), and the fear of death. This first part of the book ends by summarizing biblical teaching about the law of God, the hidden God (deus absconditus), and God's wrath against sin. Part Two ("Reconciliation") sets forth the Christian teaching of the good news about Jesus Christ, the redeemer. While the law of God is experienced by all human beings, even apart from the Christian message, the gospel is received by hearing the biblical promise of God's forgiveness in Christ and by trusting it in faith. Part Three ("Freedom") offers a brief description of Lutheran ethics, in which the forgiven sinner lives out his or her "new life in Christ" in responsible freedom within the various "orders" in creation (i.e., in one's family, in civil society, through art/culture, through knowledge and education, and in business).

Elert's most important and influential work was also produced in this period: his two-volume, 1000-page study of "the structure of Lutheranism." The first volume presents a historical trajectory of key Lutheran teachings, the central one of which is the proper distinction between law and gospel. Elert called this central theme the "evangelischer Ansatz," the "gospel point of departure" or the "gospel entry point." He also called it "the confessional constant," which he found to be "effective" through all the historical changes of Lutheranism, a constant "that is operative beyond individual connections and, as a dominant force, either determines or helps determine the outcome." As he traced this historical dynamic, he judged that the "evangelischer Ansatz" had been strongest in Luther's theology, was properly developed in the Augsburg Confession and its Apology, was partly strengthened and partly weakened in the writings of Philip Melanchthon, was partly renewed and partly distorted in Formula of Concord, and was significantly distorted in the periods of Lutheran Orthodoxy, Pietism, and Rationalism. The second volume follows the same historical trajectory from the sixteenth century to the early twentieth century, but this time Elert focuses on the social teachings and social consequences of Lutheranism.

During the 1930s, Elert worked on developing the principles for a contemporary-Lutheran, systematic summary of Christian teaching. This work, which began with his assumption of the chair in systematic theology at Erlangen in 1932, culminated in the publication of his 700-page Der christliche Glaube [Christian Dogmatics] in 1940. His colleague, Paul Althaus, deemed this book "the first great contradiction... against the theology of Karl Barth from the Lutheran side." The purpose of dogmatics, according to Elert, is to find within the normative content of biblical proclamation that point at which it "confronts contemporary human beings most immediately with the reality of its subject matter," and to ward off misunderstandings. The distinction between law and gospel is the organizing principle of the work as a whole. This principle was the decisive issue in Elert's criticism of Barth's theology and the Barmen Declaration. In Elert's view, the latter lacks a proper understanding of the revelation of God's law. Whereas the Barmen Declaration states that "Jesus Christ... is the one Word of God whom we must hear and to whom we must give trust and obedience in life and in death," Elert stressed that God always addresses every human being in two words, law and gospel, and that these two words are qualitatively different from each other. Over against Barth's essay, "Gospel and Law," Elert argued that we must first understand that we stand under God's law before we can hear and trust the gospel aright, yet nowhere "in the Barmen theses is there a word about God's law. God's law is ignored—one can hardly express it otherwise."

In the year after Elert wrote his essay on "law and gospel," he published the last of his large books, Das christliche Ethos [The Christian Ethos]. This 595-page book, which is also guided by the real dialectic between law and gospel, describes "the ethos" under God's law (whereby God is experienced and revealed as creator, preserver, and judge) and "the ethos" under God's grace (whereby faith trusts that God has reconciled the sinner through Christ). Each "ethos" results from the very different verdicts that God renders "under law" and "under grace." Thus, Christian ethics "must approach its subject" from these two differing verdicts of God.

In the final years of his life, Elert turned his attention to issues in the history of dogma, particularly in the areas of christology and eucharistic fellowship. Over against tendencies in the early church to understand christology in terms of the Neo-Platonic dualism of the finite and the infinite and of the concept of Christ as a political king, "Elert advocated turning from the dogma about Christ, and its controversies, to the portraiture of Christ found in the four Gospels."

== Elert's relationship to National Socialism and the Aryan Paragraph ==
Prior to 1933, Elert had been a constitutional monarchist. "I was reared in the fear of God, thriftiness, and affirmation of the state." While he was never a member of the Nazi Party, he did support the rise of Hitler. That support took place in the wake of the abdication of Kaiser Wilhelm II and in view of the social, political, and economic crises of the Weimar era. On June 11, 1934, he signed the "Ansbach Counsel," which included a pledge of obedience to the Leader. A short time later, however, Elert withdrew from the group that had produced this document since the group became associated with the program of the "German Christians" who were seeking to change the Evangelical Church in Germany to fit with Nazi ideals. In September 1933 Elert and his colleague, Paul Althaus, published their opinion about the Aryan Paragraph. According to this opinion, the Evangelical Church in Germany, for the time being, should obey the government and limit its offices to non-Jews, even though Christians of Jewish descent remain full members of the church because of their baptism. While supporting the government's law, Elert and Althaus did offer a caution: "It offends the nature of the ministry, of ordination, and of the pastoral call, if the church should as a general practice dismiss from its service all clergy of Jewish or half-Jewish descent, who have proved themselves in their ministry, solely on account of their descent. It's not... that their remaining in the pastoral office, but rather their dismissal, requires a special reason from case to case." While Elert expressed his reservations about the Nazi regime privately, he continued, as a state employee, to pretend to support the regime publicly during his deanship. "Although he actively worked against the infiltration of Nazism and the Deutsche Christen" in the Erlangen theology faculty, "he remained silent in the face of other anti-Semitic actions on the part of the Nazis. While he may have been privately critical of Hitler, his understanding and application of Romans 13 and 1 Peter 2, and his understanding of the orders of creation, prevented him from openly criticizing" the regime. Eventually, in 1943, the Nazis removed him from being dean of the theology faculty, when they realized that he had been acting contrary to Nazi policies. For example, as dean, he had kept the theology faculty free of Nazi-Party members and "German Christians" (Deutsche Christen), and, "at great personal risk" vis-a-vis the Gestapo, he had helped to shield at least forty students who should have been expelled from the university because of their Jewish descent or political views. Following two investigations by the American military in 1945 and 1946, Elert and his colleagues in the theology faculty were officially cleared to resume their teaching and scholarly work. In a report that Elert prepared sometime before August 1946, he explained his position on National Socialism. Near the end of this report, he stated, "I have had to pay with the blood of my sons for the blood-guilt that Hitler and his people brought over our entire people. I do not need to say what I think about the war criminals. I am convinced that, together with Nazi ideology, also the whole spirit of militarism must be eliminated from our people." After the war, Elert joined a liberal-democratic political party.

== Principal writings ==
For a complete list of Elert's writings, see the bibliography at the end of a collection of essays that commemorates his life and work.

- Abendmahl und Kirchengemeinschaft in der alten Kirche Hauptsächliche des Ostens [Eucharist and Church Fellowship in the Early Church Mainly of the East], (Berlin: Lutherisches Verlagshaus, 1954): translated by Dr. Norman E. Nagel: Werner Elert, Eucharist and Church Fellowship in the First Four Centuries, Norman E. Nagel, trans., (St. Louis: CPH, 1966).
- Der Ausgang der altkirchlichen Christologie: Eine Untersuchung über Theodor von Pharan und seine Zeit als Einführung in die alte Dogmengeschichte [The Outcome of the Christology of the Early Church: An Investigation of Theodore of Pharan and His Times as an Introduction to Early History of Dogma], (Berlin: Lutherisches Verlagshaus, 1957): edited and published posthumously.
- Das christliche Ethos [The Christian Ethos], (Tübingen: Furche-Verlag, 1949): translated by Carl J. Schindler: Werner Elert, The Christian Ethos, Carl J. Schindler, trans., (Philadelphia: Fortress Press, 1957).
- Der christliche Glaube [The Christian Faith], (Hamburg: Furche-Verlag, 1940; 2d ed., 1941; 3rd ed., 1955, reprint, 1988): the chapters on the Lord's Supper and the Last Things were published as monographs in "The Contemporary Theology Series": Werner Elert, The Lord's Supper Today, Martin Bertram and Rudolph F. Norden, trans., (St. Louis: CPH, 1973) and Werner Elert, Last Things, Martin Bertram and Rudolph F. Norden, trans., (St. Louis: CPH, 1974). The remainder of the work was translated by Martin Bertram and Walter R. Bouman in 1974 but remains unpublished.
- Gericht und Gnade, Gesetz und Evangelium: Werner Elert als Prediger zwischen 1910 und 1950, ed. Niels-Peter Moritzen (Erlangen: Martin-Luther-Verlag, 2012. This book is a collection of Elert's sermons.
- "Gesetz und Evangelium" in Zwischen Gnade und Ungnade: Abwandlungen des Themas Gesetz und Evangelium. Munich: Evangelischer Presseverband für Bayern, 1948: translated by Edward H. Schroeder as Law and Gospel. Facet Books: Social Ethics Series—16. Philadelphia: Fortress Press, 1967.
- Der Kampf um das Christentum. Geschichte der Beziehungen zwischen dem evangelischen Christentum in Deutschland und dem allgemeinen Denken seit Schleiermacher und Hegel [The Struggle for Christianity: History of the Relation between Evangelical Christianity in Germany and General Thought Since Schleiermacher and Hegel], (Munich, 1921).
- Morphologie des Luthertums [The Structure of Lutheranism], (Munich: C.H. Beck'sche Verlagsbuchhandlung, 1931–32):
  - Volume 1: Theologie und Weltanschauung des Luthertums hauptsächlich im 16. und 17. Jahrhundert [The Theology and World View of Lutheranism Mainly in the 16th and 17th Centuries]: translated by Walter A. Hansen: Werner Elert, The Structure of Lutheranism: The Theology and Philosophy of Life of Lutheranism Especially in the Sixteenth and Seventeenth Centuries, trans. Walter R. Hansen; foreword by Jaroslav Pelikan (St. Louis: CPH, 1962).
  - Volume 2: Soziallehren und Sozialwirkungen des Luthertums [Social Doctrine and Social Effects of Lutheranism] (This second volume has not been translated into English.)
- "Rudolf Rocholls Philosophie der Geschichte," Inaugural Doctoral Dissertation in the Philosophy Faculty of the Friedrich-Alexander University (Erlangen and Leipzig, 1910).

== Bibliography ==
- Joachim Bayer, Werner Elerts apologetisches Frühwerk (Berlin: de Gruyter, 2007)
- Matthew L. Becker, "Werner Elert (1885–1954)," in Twentieth-Century Lutheran Theologians, ed. Mark Mattes (Göttingen: Vandenhoeck & Ruprecht, 2015), 93–135
- Karlmann Beyschlag, Die Erlanger Theologie (Erlangen: Martin-Luther Verlag, 1993)
- Friedrich Duensing, Gesetz als Gericht: Eine lutherische Kategorie in der Theologie Werner Elerts und Friedrich Gogartens (Munich: Chr. Kaiser Verlag, 1970)
- Lowell C. Green, The Erlangen School of Theology (Fort Wayne, Ind.: Lutheran Legacy, 2010)
- Thomas Kaufmann, "Werner Elert als Kirchenhistoriker," Zeitschrift für Theologie und Kirche 93 (1996), 193–242
- Rudolf Keller and Michael Roth, eds., Mit dem Menschen Verhandeln über den Sachgehalt des Evangeliums: Die Bedeutung der Theologie Werner Elerts für die Gegenwart, 2d. ed. (Erlangen: Martin-Luther-Verlag, 2006)
- Walter Sparn, "Werner Elert," in Profile des Luthertums: Biographien zum 20. Jahrhundert, ed. Walter Dieter Hauschild (Gütersloh: Güterslohverlagshaus, 1998), 159–83
- Ronald Thiemann, "A Conflict of Perspectives: The Debate between Karl Barth and Werner Elert," Ph.D. diss. (Yale University, 1976)
