= Friedrich-Ebert-Gymnasium =

Coordinates: 53°27′56″N 9°57′54″E

Friedrich-Ebert-Gymnasium abbr.: FEG, pronounced [ʔɛf.ʔeːɡeː]
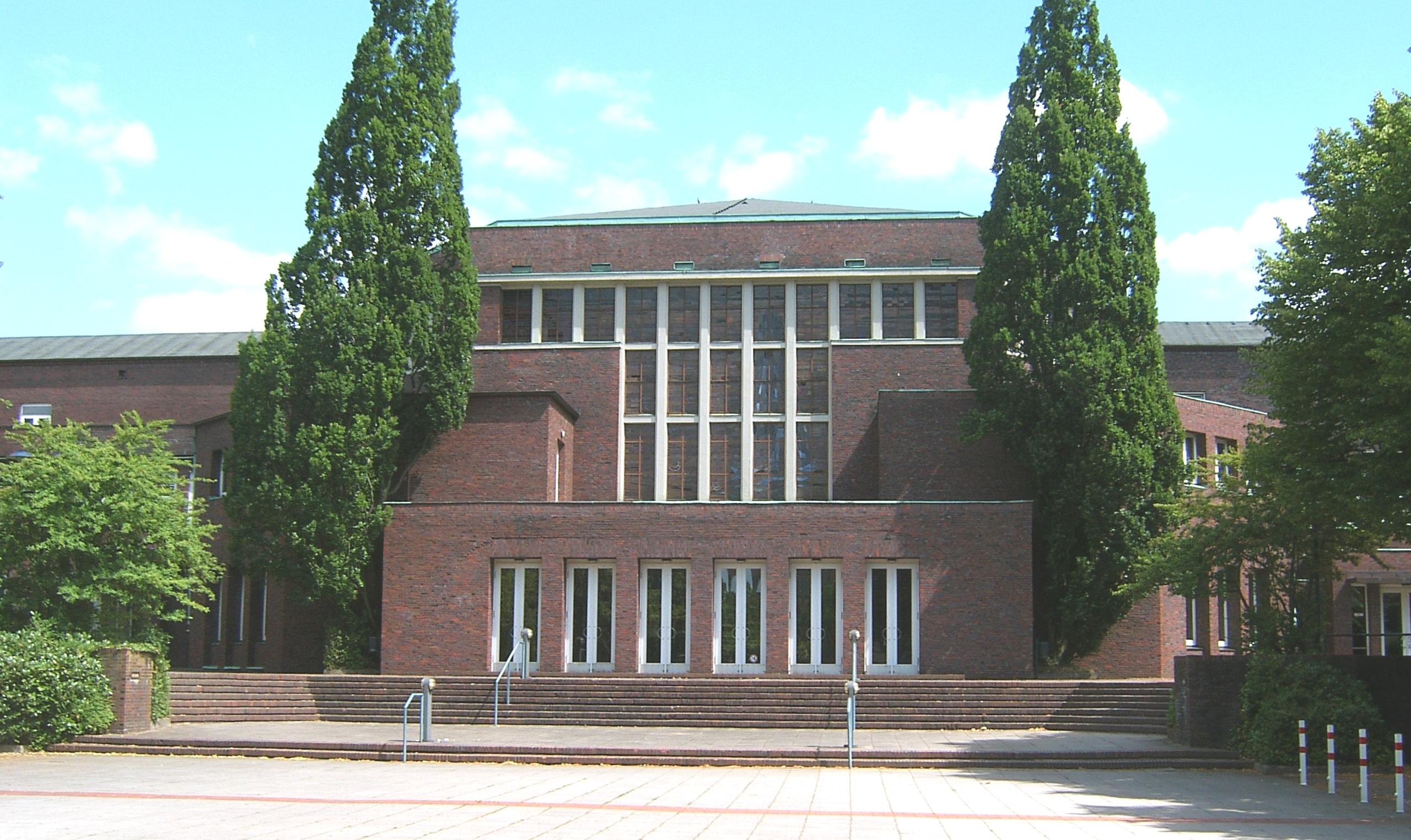
- Assembly Hall "Friedrich-Ebert-Halle"

Location
- Alter Postweg 30 – 38; Harburg, Hamburg; 21075; Germany

Information
- Type: Gymnasium
- Established: c. 1628; 398 years ago
- Head of school: Christoph Posselt
- Staff: ca. 53
- Grades: 5-12, Abitur
- Enrollment: 735
- Language: German
- Colours: red, white
- Yearbook: Jahresbericht des Friedrich-Ebert-Gymnasiums
- Website: feg-hamburg.de

The Friedrich-Ebert-Gymnasium (FEG) is a German high school (see "Gymnasium") in the Harburg borough of Hamburg, Germany, that is known to exist since 1628. The school is famous for its Friedrich-Ebert-Halle, where the Beatles had their first professional recording session, backing Tony Sheridan in 1961.

In 1968 it was renamed from "Gymnasium für Jungen Harburg" (engl.: "Gymnasium for Boys in Harburg") after Friedrich Ebert, first president of the Weimar Republic.

The school offers three main sectors: the humanistic (with Latin since grade 5, "L" classes), the musical ("M" classes providing own class orchestras or ensembles), and the "MINT" (abbreviation of "Mathematik, Informatik, Naturwissenschaften, Technik" - “Maths, Information Technology, Science, Technics”, former "NaWi" for "Naturwissenschaften", i.e. Natural Sciences) sector (formerly "neusprachlicher Zweig" new languages sector with "E" classes, "E" meaning "English"). The school also provides exchanges with Great Britain, Mexico, Poland, and the United States, the latter of which being part of GAPP. The American partner school of the FEG is Kirkwood High School, St Louis.

In grade 8, pupils have to take courses in either Greek, Spanish, DSP ("Darstellendes Spiel" - roughly “dramatic play”), or NIP ("Naturwissenschaftlich-informatisches Praktikum" - “scientific IT-based practicum”).

Due to lack of interest in it, the humanistic sector is planned to be discontinued as of 2012. Even so, Latin will still be offered for grade 6 and Greek for grade 8 (see above). The school has been undergoing a renovation since 2009, which is overrunning its time. Both issues are part of the aimed-at new modern school image "Ebert 2012".

School year 2009/2010 was the first grade 11 that had to take courses by the new profile system ("Profiloberstufe"). The same year Abitur after twelve years was introduced, leading to a double examination ("Doppeljahrgang"). Currently there are five profiles offered:

- Sprachliches Profil (linguistic profile) with either French or Spanish being profile-providing
- Musikalisches Profil (musical profile) with Music profile-providing
- Geschichtsprofil (history profile) with History profile-providing
- Geo-Bio-Profil (geographic-biologic profile) with Geography and Biology profile-providing
- Naturwissenschaftliches Profil (scientific profile) with either Biology, Physics or Chemistry profile-providing

== Publications ==
Every year the school publishes the "Jahresbericht des Friedrich-Ebert-Gymnasiums" ("Annual Report of the Friedrich-Ebert-Gymnasium"), a yearbook intended to be published around 6 December (Saint Nicholas Day). Since 2006 the Jahresbericht has been printed in colour, prior it used to be in monochrome except for photographs of the classes. Currently the Jahresbericht costs €10.

There also used to be a Student newspaper called "Der heiße FEGer" (a wordplay on the school's abbreviation and the term "heißer Feger", literally "hot sweeper", for a sexually attractive woman) that was published every now and then; for some years now (2011), there has not been any new issue of it.

The "Quadratdampfer MS Kay Anker" ("Quadratic Steam Boat MS Kay Anker") is the school's non-official satire magazine launched in May 2009. Created by a single student, it is neither published at a constant rate (but usually one per month) nor actually sold but lent to students and several teachers interested in it. Nevertheless, it is enjoying great popularity amongst the creator's grade and the usual readers in staff. However, since the creator is heading towards Abitur, it is very likely to be shut down in 2012.

== Notable alumni ==
- Werner Elert
- Volker Rühe
- Manuel Sarrazin
