= Orders of creation =

Orders of creation (or sometimes creation orders) refer to a doctrine of theology asserting God's hand in establishing social domains such as the family, the church, the state, and the economy. Although it is commonly traced back to early Lutheranism, the doctrine is also discussed within Reformed Christianity as well as modern Judaism. During the 1930s–1940s rise of European neo-orthodoxy, the meaning of this doctrine in regard to the foundations of church and state (e.g., how its interpretation by 19th-century German theologians may have aided in legitimizing the then-contemporary Nazi party or how it would support the reality or non-reality of natural law) came into dispute amongst such famed theologians as Karl Barth, Emil Brunner, and Dietrich Bonhoeffer. Though a specific 1934 controversy between Brunner and Barth over the interpretations of the doctrines of natural law and the orders of creation was not inherently political, Barth alleged that Brunner's position gave credibility to pro-Nazi "German Christians".

== See also ==
- Natural law
- Natural theology
