= Adolf Paul Johannes Althaus =

German Lutheran theologian

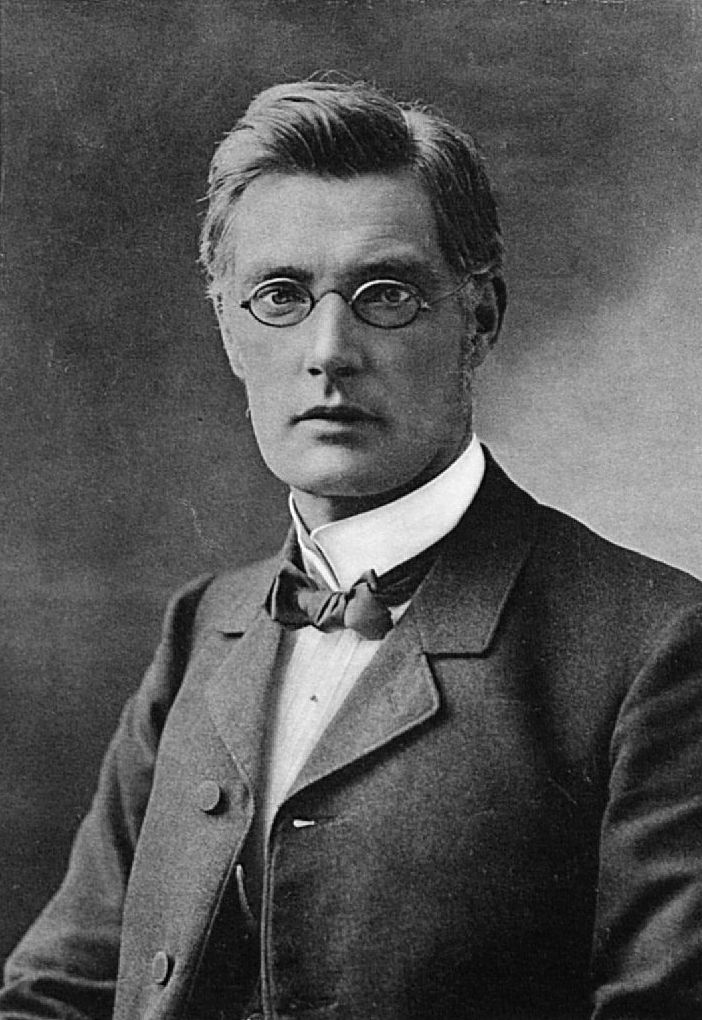
Adolf Paul Johannes Althaus.

Adolf Paul Johannes Althaus (29 November 1861 – 9 April 1925) was a German Lutheran theologian, born in Fallersleben (17 m. n.e. of Brunswick). He was a professor at the universities of Göttingen and Leipzig since 1897. He was the father of Paul Althaus (1888–1966). He died in Leipzig.

== Works (selection) ==
- Die historische und dogmatische Grundlage der lutherischen Taufliturgie [The Historical and Dogmatic Foundation of the Lutheran Liturgy of Baptism], 1893
- Die Heilsbedeutung der Taufe im Neuen Testament [The Sacred Meaning of Baptism in the New Testament], 1897
- Frömmigkeit und Sittlichkeit nach evangelischer Auffassung [Piety and Morality from an Evangelical Point of View], 1906
- Luther als der Vater des evangelischen Kirchenliedes [Luther, the Father of the Evangelical Hymn], 1917
