= The Doctor and Student =

16th-century legal treatise

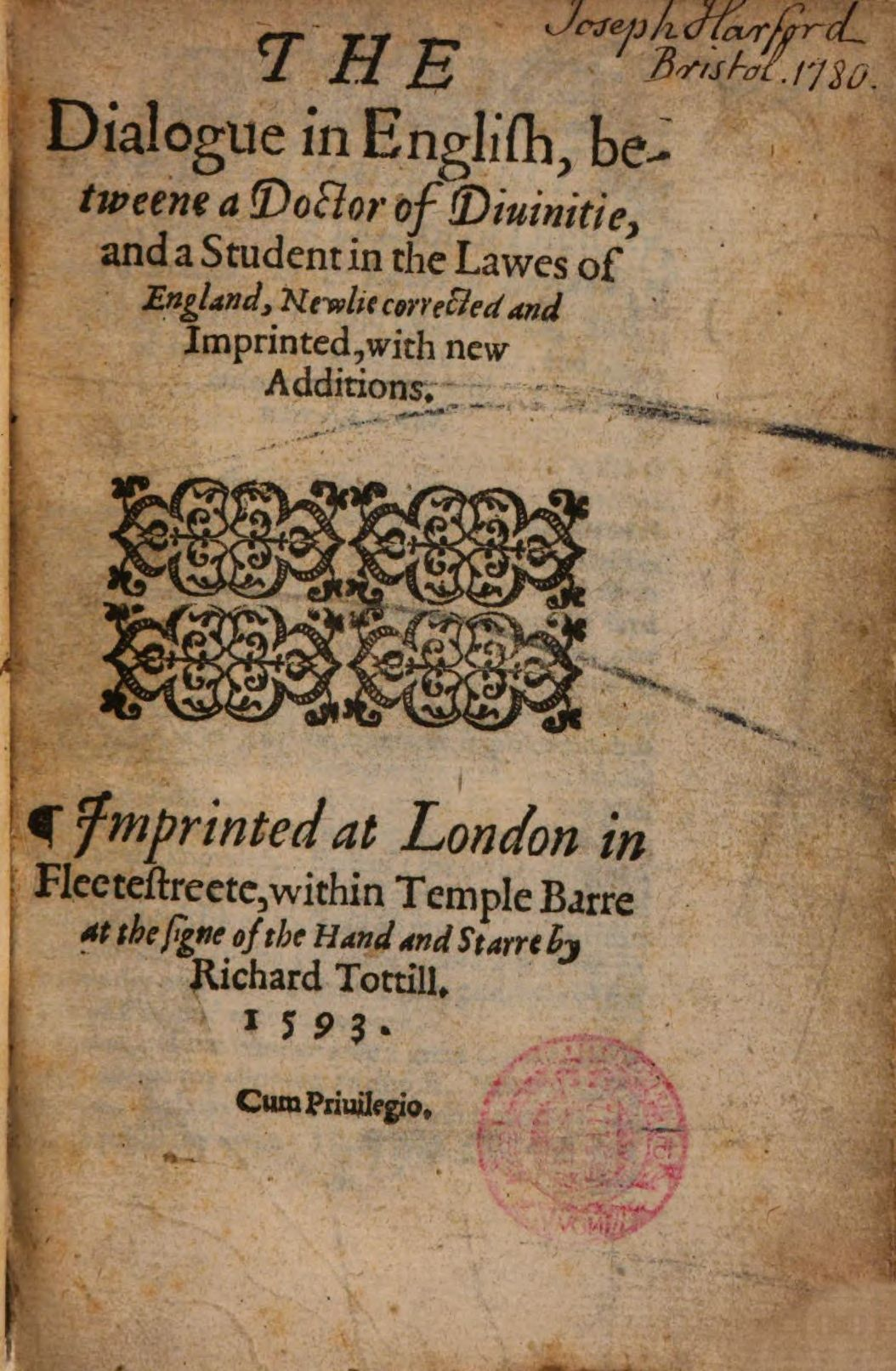
Cover page of a 1593 edition of The Doctor and Student, printed by Richard Tottel. Collection of the British Library.

The Doctor and Student: Or Dialogues between a Doctor of Divinity and a Student in the Laws of England is a legal treatise by Christopher St. Germain, first published in the early 16th century. As its name suggests, the work is structured as a set of dialogues between the eponymous doctor, a doctor of divinity; and a student of the English common law. Doctor and Student explores the relationship between the common law and equity and distinguishes a number of sources of legal principles. It was an important text for English law students at least until William Blackstone's Commentaries on the Laws of England was published in the mid-18th century.

== Textual history ==
The Doctor and Student was originally published in Latin, in two separate dialogues. It was written anonymously. The first dialogue was first published in Latin in 1523 by John Rastell; the second was first published in English on 24 November 1530 by Peter Treveris. Various other editions, with significant alterations in content, were published in the early 1530s. The two dialogues have been printed together since 1543. In total, 21 editions of the dialogues (published either separately or jointly) were released before 1600.

== Argument ==
The work is organized into two dialogues between a doctor of divinity and a student of law. The first describes English law, arguing for a robust form of parliamentary supremacy. The second describes the relation between statute and common law, on the one hand; and ecclesiastical law, on the other. Hanson divides the argument differently. First, according to Hanson, Doctor and Student establishes a typology of law, identifying its "types and sources". Second, it embarks on an extensive discussion of equity.

In Doctor and Student, St. Germain begins by describing the law eternal, or the divine source from which all laws are derived. The laws derived from this, in turn, he divides into "the law of God", i.e. revelation; "the law of man," i.e. positive law; and "the law of reason". The law eternal is manifested in the three kinds of temporal laws. Later in the work, St. Germain outlines six sources of English law: the laws of God, the laws of reason, "general" and "local" custom, maxim, and statute.

Schoek argues that St. Germain, in Doctor and Student, "was doing nothing less than challenging the traditional system of canon law". This is evidently due in part to the radical conclusion of the work: according to Hanson, the book advances a legal theory that "subordinate[s] all law to regal authority". Sale suggests that the work involves a "challenge" by the eponymous doctor and student to the common law "from the perspective of conscience". This was a somewhat bizarre critical stance, because at the time the common law and equity were enforced by different courts in England; the Court of Chancery (since abolished) was where matters of conscience and fairness were most relevant to the adjudication of disputes, whereas the common law courts concerned themselves with a stricter application of legal precedent.

== Reception ==
Thomas More, in Apology and The Debellation of Salem and Bizance, responded negatively to Doctor and Student. St. Germain delivered a rebuttal in 1533.

Doctor and Student was relied on by English law students until the advent of Blackstone's Commentaries on the Laws of England in 1765.

The publication of Doctor and Student is recognized by modern scholars as the transition point where the Court of Chancery began to evolve from a court of conscience into a court of equity.

Charles Howard McIlwain describes Doctor and Student as "probably the most valuable source of our knowledge concerning the relation of the law of nature to the law of England in the late mediaeval or early modern times".

== Sources ==
- Cummings, Brian (2009). "Conscience and the Law in Thomas More". Renaissance Studies. 23 (4): 463–485. doi:10.1111/j.1477-4658.2009.00605.x. ISSN 0269-1213. JSTOR 24419384. S2CID 159733022.
- Eppley, Daniel (28 June 2013). Defending Royal Supremacy and Discerning God's Will in Tudor England. Ashgate Publishing. ISBN 978-1-4094-7990-1.
- Hanson, Donald W. (1970). From Kingdom to Commonwealth: The Development of Civic Consciousness in English Political Thought. Harvard University Press. ISBN 978-0-674-18274-5. OCLC 1149308784.
- McIlwain, Charles Howard (1910). The High Court of Parliament and Its Supremacy. New Haven: Yale University Press. OCLC 1046051603.
- Schoek, R. J. (1987). "Strategies of Rhetoric in St. German's Doctor and Student". In Eales, Richard; Sullivan, David (eds.). The Political Context of Law: Proceedings of the Seventh British Legal History Conference, Canterbury, 1985. A & C Black. ISBN 978-0-907628-84-2.
- Thorne, S. E. (March 1930). "St. Germain's Doctor and Student". The Library. s4-X (4): 421–426. doi:10.1093/library/s4-X.4.421. ISSN 0024-2160.
- Walters, Mark D. (2003). "St. German on Reason and Parliamentary Sovereignty". Cambridge Law Journal. 62 (2): 335–370. doi:10.1017/S0008197303006342. ISSN 0008-1973. JSTOR 4509001.
