= Neo-orthodoxy =

Christian theological movement developed after WW1

Neo-orthodoxy or Neoorthodoxy, also known as crisis theology and dialectical theology, was a theological movement developed in the aftermath of the First World War, within Protestant Christianity. The movement was largely a reaction against doctrines of 19th-century liberal theology, and a reevaluation of the teachings of the Reformation. Karl Barth is the leading figure associated with the movement. In the United States, Reinhold Niebuhr was a leading proponent of neo-orthodoxy. It is unrelated to Eastern Orthodoxy.

== Revelation ==
Neo-orthodoxy strongly emphasises the revelation of God by God as the source of Christian doctrine. This is in contrast to natural theology; the issue remains a controversial topic within some circles of Christianity to this day.

Barth totally rejects natural theology. As Thomas F. Torrance wrote:

So far as theological content is concerned, Barth's argument runs like this. If the God whom we have actually come to know through Jesus Christ really is Father, Son, and Holy Spirit in his own eternal and undivided Being, then what are we to make of an independent natural theology that terminates, not upon the Being of the Triune God—i.e., upon God as he really is in himself—but upon some Being of God in general? Natural theology by its very operation abstracts the existence of God from his act, so that if it does not begin with deism, it imposes deism upon theology.

— Thomas Torrance, The Ground and Grammar of Theology, p. 89

Emil Brunner, on the other hand, believed that natural theology still had an important, although not decisive, role. This led to a sharp disagreement between the two men, the first of several controversies that prevented the movement from acquiring a unified, homogeneous character.

== Transcendence of God ==
Most neo-orthodox thinkers stressed the transcendence of God. Barth believed that the emphasis on the immanence of God had led human beings to imagine God to amount to nothing more than humanity writ large. He stressed the "infinite qualitative distinction" between the human and the divine, a reversion to older Protestant teachings on the nature of God and a rebuttal against the intellectual heritage of philosophical idealism. This led to a general devaluation of philosophical and metaphysical approaches to the faith, although some thinkers, notably Paul Tillich, attempted a median course between strict transcendence and ontological analysis of the human condition, a stand that caused a further division in the movement.

== Existentialism ==
Some of the neo-orthodox theologians made use of existentialism. Rudolf Bultmann (who was associated with Barth and Brunner in the 1920s in particular) was strongly influenced by his former colleague at Marburg, the German existentialist philosopher Martin Heidegger.

Reinhold Niebuhr and (to a lesser extent, and mostly in his earlier writings) Karl Barth, on the other hand, were influenced by the writings of the 19th-century Danish philosopher Søren Kierkegaard. Kierkegaard was a critic of the then-fashionable liberal Christian modernist effort to "rationalise" Christianity—to make it palatable to those whom Friedrich Schleiermacher termed the "cultured despisers of religion". Instead, under pseudonyms such as Johannes Climacus, Kierkegaard maintained that Christianity is "absurd" (i.e., it transcends human understanding) and presents the individual with paradoxical choices. The decision to become a Christian, Kierkegaard thought, is not fundamentally rational but passional—a leap of faith. Opponents of Kierkegaard's approach and neo-orthodoxy in general have termed this fideism, a blatant refusal to find support for the faith outside its own circles. For the most part, proponents reply that no such support exists, that supposed reasons and evidences for faith are fabrications of fallen human imagination, and in effect constitute idolatry. Some neo-orthodox proponents have gone so far as to claim greater affinity with atheists in that regard than with the theological and cultural trappings of so-called "Christendom", which Kierkegaard venomously denounced in his later works.

== Sin and human nature ==
In neo-orthodoxy, sin is seen not as mere error or ignorance; it is not something that can be overcome by reason or social institutions (e.g., schools); it can only be overcome by the grace of God through Jesus Christ. Sin is seen as something bad within human nature itself. This amounts to a renovation of historical teachings about original sin (especially drawing upon Augustine of Hippo), although thinkers generally avoided forensic interpretations of it and consequential elaborations about total depravity. The means of supposed transmission of sin, to neo-orthodox minds, is not as important as its pervasive reality. The association of original sin with sexuality—an abiding idea—leads to moralism, a rectitude that is overly optimistic about human capabilities to resist the power of unfaith and disobedience in all areas of life, not just sexual behavior. This core conviction about the universality and intransigence of sin has elements of determinism, and has not surprisingly offended those who think people are capable, wholly or in part, of effecting their own salvation (i.e., synergism). In other words, neo-orthodoxy might be said to have a greater appreciation of tragedy in human existence than either conservatism or liberalism, a point emphasized by a latter-day interpreter of the movement, Canadian theologian Douglas John Hall.

== Relation to other theologies ==
Neo-orthodoxy is distinct from both liberal Protestantism and evangelicalism, but, notwithstanding some interpreters, it cannot properly be considered a mediating position between the two. Neo-orthodoxy draws from various Protestant heritages (primarily Lutheran and Calvinist) in an attempt to rehabilitate dogma outside the restraints of Enlightenment thought. Unlike confessionalist or fundamentalist reactions to individualist approaches to the faith, however, neo-orthodox adherents saw no value in rehabilitating tradition for its own sake. Past Protestant doctrine is used only to the degree that it affirms the living Word of God in Jesus Christ. Propositions in and of themselves, whether from the Bible or not, are, to the neo-orthodox, insufficient to build theology upon. Also, in the pursuit of social justice, intellectual freedom, and honesty, the neo-orthodox, unlike the conservatives they were accused by detractors of resembling, often made practical alliances with liberals. Both groups shared a deep hostility to authoritarianism of any kind, in both church and state.

The breadth of the term neo-orthodox, though, has led to its abandonment as a useful classification, especially after new emphases in mainline Protestant theology appeared during the 1960s. These included the "Death of God" movement, which attacked the linguistic and cultural foundations of all previous theology, and a renewal of interest among Biblical scholars in the "historical Jesus", something neo-orthodox theologians largely dismissed as irrelevant to serious Christian faith. Still, some of the movement's positions and worldviews would inform such later movements as liberation theology during the 1970s and 1980s and post-liberalism during the 1990s and 2000s—in spite of theological and ethical differences from both (i.e., liberationist use of Marxist conceptual analysis and narrativist dependence upon virtue theory).

== Influence upon American Protestantism ==
From its inception, this school of thought has largely been unacceptable to Protestant fundamentalism, as neo-orthodoxy generally accepts biblical criticism; has remained mostly silent on the perceived conflicts caused by evolutionary science; and, in espousing these two viewpoints, it retains at least some aspects of 19th-century liberal theology.

== Critical assessment ==
Neo-orthodoxy was originally met with criticism by fellow Protestant theologians in Germany: Ferdinand Kattenbusch accused Barth of being a reactionary theologian, who wanted to overthrow the fruits that liberal theology acquired since the end of the 18th century, while Paul Tillich saw Barth as a "kerygmatic theologian" who wanted to derive the contents of his theology solely from the Bible without regard for the "situation". Such views started to be abandoned after Friedrich-Wilhelm Marquardt proposed instead that Barth's theology was in fact the product of his activity on behalf of the working classes in his Safenwil parish. Such a view proved controversial and is nowadays rarely defended, but led to the demise of the traditional view on neo-orthodoxy held in German circles.

According to Bruce L. McCormack (Princeton Theological Seminary) the acceptance of Barth's theology in the English-speaking world only happened after a "process of normalization" which adjusted Barth's theology in accordance with more traditional norms.

== Important figures of the movement ==
- Karl Barth
- Eduard Thurneysen
- Emil Brunner
- Rudolf Bultmann
- Friedrich Gogarten
- Reginald H. Fuller
- Dietrich Bonhoeffer

== See also ==
- Christian existentialism
- Christian realism
- Confessing movement
- New Covenant theology
- Orders of creation
- Paleo-orthodoxy
- Postliberal theology
- Radical orthodoxy
- Tidehverv
