= Christopher St. Germain =

English lawyer, legal writer, and polemicist

- Born: 1460; Shilton, Warwickshire, Kingdom of England
- Died: 1540 (aged 79–80)
- Occupations: Lawyer; legal writer; polemicist
- Era: Tudor period
- Known for: Doctor and Student; Treatise Concerning the Division between the Spiritualty and Temporality
- Notable work: Doctor and Student (1528); Salem and Bizance (1533)

Christopher St. Germain (1460–1540) was an English lawyer, legal writer, and Protestant polemicist during the reign of Henry VIII. He is best known as the author of Doctor and Student (1528), and as an early theorist of equity in English jurisprudence. In his later years, St. Germain became involved in theological controversies, notably engaging in a printed debate with Sir Thomas More over the division of authority between the clergy and the laity.

== Biography ==
Christopher St. Germain was born in 1460 in Shilton, Warwickshire. His father was Sir Henry St. Germain, a knight. His mother, Anne, was the daughter of Thomas Tyndale.

He was educated at Oxford and the Inner Temple.

In 1528, St. Germain published his first book, Dialogus de fundamentis legum Anglie et de conscientia, known as The Doctor and Student after the titles of the two interlocutors, a doctor of divinity and a student of the laws of England, a barrister. The book is a study of the relationship between the English common law and conscience. It was the first study of the role of equity in English law, and set the terms for later discussions. An English translation, probably done by St. Germain himself, appeared in 1530 or 1531. A second dialogue appeared in English in 1530, along with additional chapters referred to as the New Addicions. Although Doctor and Student was written as a discussion of conscience and law, its enduring popularity into the 19th century was a result of its clear introduction to common law concepts. Until Blackstone published his Commentaries on the Laws of England in 1765–1769, it was used as a student primer.

In 1532, St. Germain published the Treatise Concerning the Division between the Spiritualty and Temporality, a pamphlet purporting to mediate between the laity and the clergy, but, as Thomas More argued in a response, his Apology, actually interested in increasing the divide. St. Germain responded to More's Apology with the dialogue Salem and Bizance, to which More responded with his Debellation of Salem and Bizance in 1533. The following year St Germain published his Additions of Salem and Bizance, the final text in the dispute between St. Germain and More.

A number of anonymous pamphlets, very likely written by St. Germain, appeared in the 1530s, before his death at the age of eighty in 1540.

== Sources ==
- Baker, J. H. “St German, Christopher (c.1460–1540/41)” In Oxford Dictionary of National Biography, edited by H. C. G. Matthew and Brian Harrison. Oxford: OUP, 2004. Online ed., edited by Lawrence Goldman, January 2008. http://www.oxforddnb.com/view/article/24493 (accessed 28 March 2008).
- T.F.T. Plucknett, ed. (1974). St. German's Doctor and Student. Selden Society.
- Gillespie, Vincent; Powell, Susan (2014). A Companion to the Early Printed Book in Britain, 1476-1558. Boydell & Brewer. ISBN 978-1-84384-363-4.
- St. Germain, Christopher; Muchall, William (1886). The Doctor and Student, Or, Dialogues Between a Doctor of Divinity and a Student in the Laws of England: Containing the Grounds of Those Laws Together with Questions and Cases Concerning the Equity Thereof. Cincinnati: R. Clarke.
