= Immanuel Kant Baltic Federal University =

Public research university in Russia

Coordinates: 54°43′29″N 20°31′41″E

- Балти́йский федера́льный университе́т и́мени Иммануи́ла Ка́нта
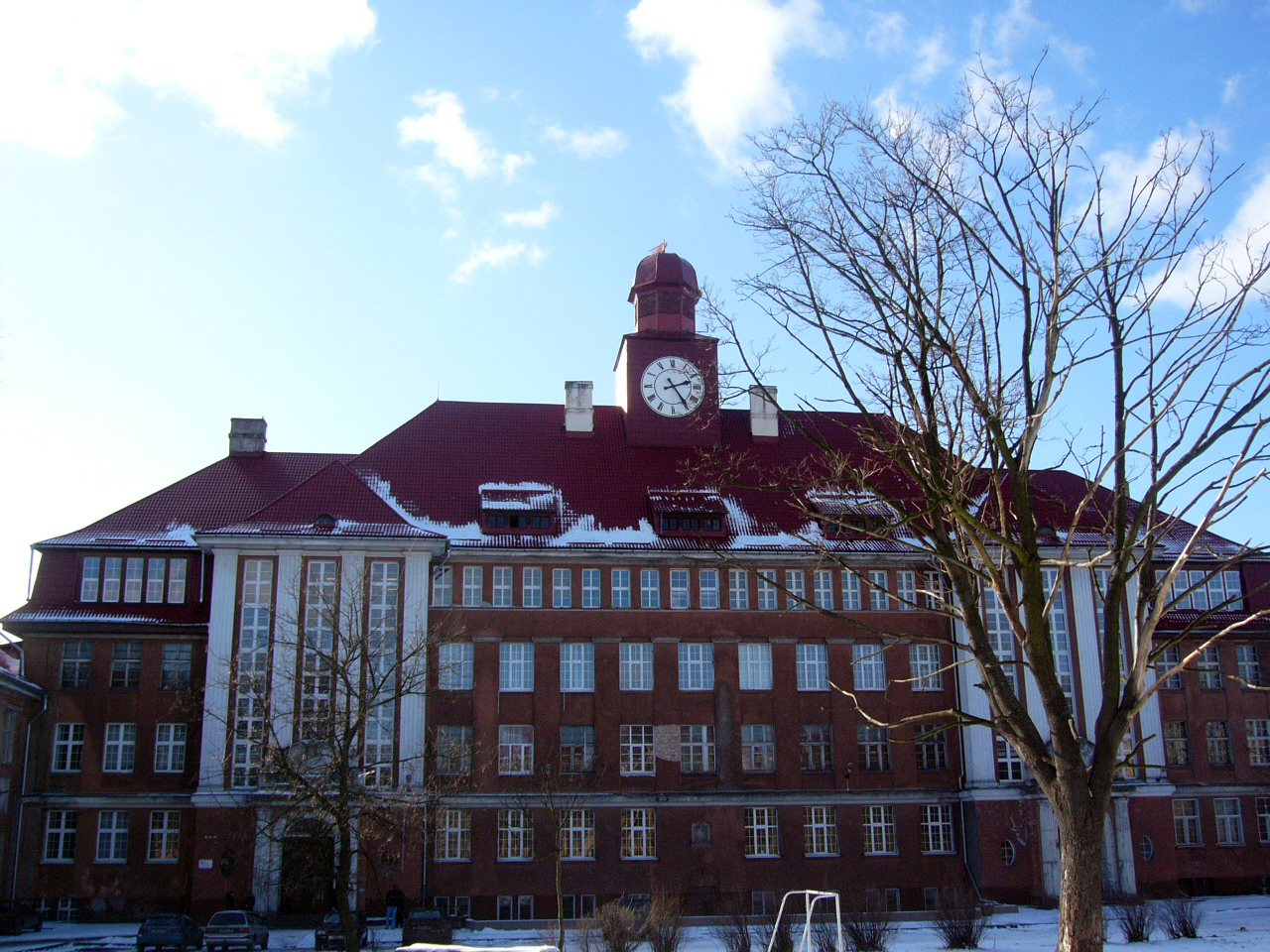
- Former names: Kaliningrad State Pedagogical Institute (1948–1967); Kaliningrad State University (1967–2005); Immanuel Kant Russian State University (2005–2010)
- Type: Public
- Established: 1947
- President: Andrey Klemeshev
- Rector: Maxim Demin
- Total staff: 1,400
- Students: 12,000
- Location: Kaliningrad, Russia
- Website: www.kantiana.ru

Immanuel Kant Baltic Federal University (IKBFU; Russian: Балтийский федеральный университет имени Иммануила Канта) is a public university located in the exclave of Kaliningrad, Russia.

Following World War II, the city of Königsberg was transferred to Soviet Union according to the Potsdam Agreement, and the city was renamed Kaliningrad in 1946. The University of Königsberg, commonly known as Albertina, was closed and the remaining German population were expelled, by the terms of the Potsdam Agreement. Today, the Immanuel Kant Baltic Federal University claims to maintain the traditions of the Albertina.

== History ==
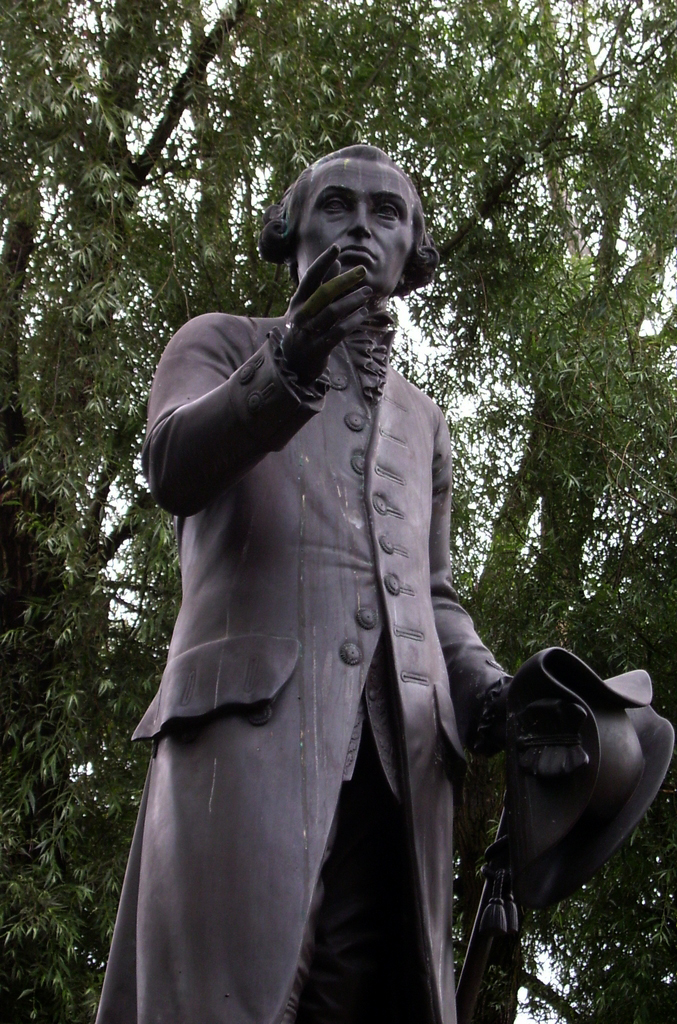
Monument to Immanuel Kant next to the building of building No. 3 of the I. Kant BFU (Universitetskaya Street, house 2, Kaliningrad, Russia). Harald Haake (opened June 27, 1992) is an exact replica of the original sculpture by Christian Daniel Rauch (1867), which disappeared during World War II.

The current university traces its origins to the University of Königsberg (Albertina), which was founded in 1544. One of its graduates was the noted philosopher Immanuel Kant. It was East Prussia's sole university and was specially regarded for its mathematics and astronomy. The campus was severely damaged by British aerial bombing in August 1944 during World War II. The Albertina was closed after Königsberg was captured by the Red Army in 1945. In 1947, the university, already under new leadership, resumed work, but now as the Kaliningrad State Pedagogical Institute (KSPI).

After the war, Königsberg was renamed Kaliningrad and the Russophone Kaliningrad State Pedagogical Institute used the old campus from 1948 to 1967, including the main Albertina building inaugurated in 1862. In 1967, the institute received the status of a university and became known as Kaliningrad State University. In 2005, during the celebrations of the 750th anniversary of the founding of Königsberg, President Vladimir Putin of Russia and Chancellor Gerhard Schröder of Germany announced that the university would be renamed Immanuel Kant Russian State University in honour of Immanuel Kant.

As of 2005, the university consisted of twelve faculties with courses ranging from Natural Sciences to the Humanities. It had approximately 12,800 students enrolled, both undergraduate and post-graduate, and 580 faculty staff. IKSUR's Kant Society was created to study Kantianism, or Kantian philosophy. The university is also interested in the historical connections between Königsberg and Russia as far back as the 16th century.

In 2010–2011, the university underwent an enlargement and rebranding process which will lead to changing its name from Immanuel Kant Russian State University to Immanuel Kant Baltic Federal University.

== Education and training ==
The Immanuel Kant Baltic Federal University of today is an educational, scientific, cultural and enlightenment centre of the westernmost region of Russia.

- The university implements more than 300 educational programmes in the fields of secondary, vocational and higher education as well as continuing and post-university education.
- The university employs 900 teaching staff.
- The total number of students and doctoral students exceeds 14,000.
- List of the IKBFU educational programmes participating in the "Best educational programme of innovative Russia" project, which is being carried out by the Guild of professional education experts, the National centre of public accreditation and the editorial board of the Akkreditathsiya v obrazovanii magazine:

Social and cultural services and tourism; Law; Services; Interpreting and translation studies; Applied mathematics and informatics; Marketing; Mathematical maintenance and administration of information systems; Tourism; Mathematics; Philosophy; Journalism; Transport management and logistics.

Percentage of students according to the major fields of study

- Humanities 37.2%
- Economics and Management 12.4%
- Services 10.7%
- Natural Sciences 10.4%
- Physical and Mathematical Sciences 8.2%
- Transport 5.8%
- Education and Pedagogy 4.4%
- Healthcare 4.0%
- Information Security 2.8%
- Electronic and Radio Engineering and Communications 1.6%
- Social Sciences 1.5%
- Culture and Arts 1.0%

== Ranking ==
University rankings

Global – Overall
- QS World: 951-1000 (2026)

Regional – Overall
- QS Emerging Europe and Central Asia: 135 (2022)

In 2020, the university was ranked #1,000+ in the Times Higher Education World University Ranking (THE WUR), and in 2022 it was ranked #2,350 in the Webometrics Ranking Web of Universities.

== Innovation ==
A science park was set up at the university in 2008. The major task of the park is the concentration of research potential.

== International cooperation ==
The level of international cooperation places IKBFU amongst the top ten higher educational institutions of Russia. The aim of the International Office is managing and coordinating international activities of the university as a whole, its students and Ph.D. candidates, teachers and staff members.

== See also ==
- Koenigsberg Observatory
- Political philosophy of Immanuel Kant
- Rechtsstaat
- Rule according to higher law
