= Judicial independence =

Concept that the judiciary should be independent

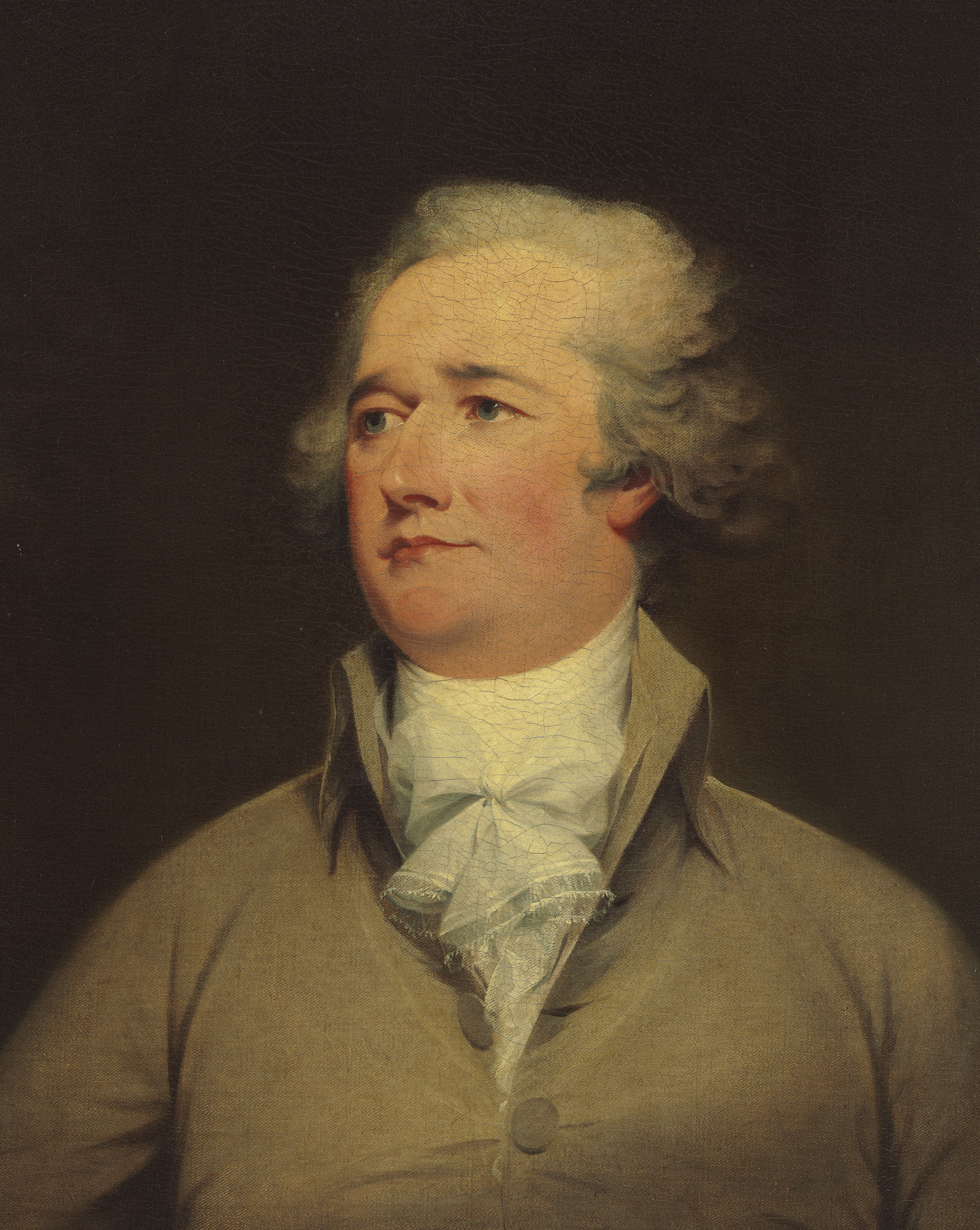
Alexander Hamilton, one of the Founding Fathers of the United States, by portraitist John Trumbull c. 1792. In The Federalist No. 78, published 28 May 1788, Hamilton wrote: "The complete independence of the courts of justice is particularly essential in a limited constitution."

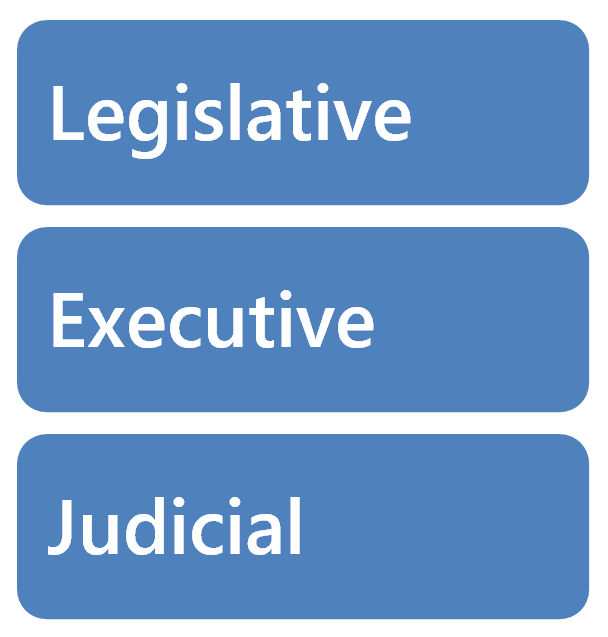
The separation of powers: legislature, executive (government) and judiciary.

Judicial independence is the concept that the judiciary should be independent from the other branches of government, meaning that courts should not be subject to improper influence from those branches or from private or partisan interests. Judicial independence is an important component of the separation of powers.

Different countries deal with the idea of judicial independence through different means of judicial selection, that is, choosing judges. One method seen as promoting judicial independence is by granting life tenure or long tenure for judges, as it would ideally free them to decide cases and make rulings according to the rule of law and judicial discretion, even if those decisions are politically unpopular or opposed by powerful interests. This concept can be traced back to 18th-century England.

== Foundation of rule of law ==
Judicial independence serves as a safeguard for rights and privileges from a limited government and prevents executive and legislative encroachment upon those rights. It serves as a foundation for the rule of law and democracy. The rule of law means that all authority and power must come from an ultimate source of law. Under an independent judicial system, the courts and their officers are free from inappropriate intervention in judicial affairs. With this independence, the judiciary can safeguard people's rights and freedoms which ensure equal protection for all.

The effectiveness of the law, and the respect that people have for the law and the government which enacts it, is dependent upon the judiciary's independence to mete out fair decisions. Furthermore, judicial independence is a pillar of economic growth, as multinational businesses and investors have confidence to invest in the economy of a nation which has a strong and stable judiciary that is insulated from interference. The judiciary's role in deciding the validity of presidential and parliamentary elections also necessitates judicial independence.

== Economic effects ==
Constitutional economics studies issues such as the proper distribution of national wealth including government spending on the judiciary. In transitional and developing countries, spending on the judiciary may be controlled by the executive. This undermines the principle of judicial independence because it creates a financial dependence of the judiciary on the executive. It is important to distinguish between two methods of corruption of the judiciary: the state (through budget planning and privileges) being the most dangerous, and private. State corruption of the judiciary can impede the ability of businesses to optimally facilitate the growth and development of a market economy.

In some countries, the constitution also prohibits the legislative branch from reducing salaries of sitting judges.

== Judicial misconduct ==
The disadvantages of having a judiciary that is seemingly too independent include possible abuse of power by judges. Self-interest, ideological dedication and even corruption may influence the decisions of judges without any checks and balances in place to prevent this abuse of power if the judiciary is completely independent. The relationship between the judiciary and the executive is a complex series of dependencies and inter-dependencies which counter-check each other and must be carefully balanced. One can be too independent of the other. Furthermore, judicial support of the executive is not as negative as it seems as the executive is the branch of government with the greatest claim to democratic legitimacy. Roger K. Warren writes that if the judiciary and executive are constantly feuding, no government can function well.

Judicial supremacy could potentially promote an elitist autocracy. Judicial aggrandizement describes the process when judges displace or subordinate the authority of elected branches, which undermines political legitimacy and can facilitate democratic backsliding.

== Judicial accountability ==
An extremely independent judiciary would also lack judicial accountability, which is the duty of a public decision-maker to explain and justify a decision and to make amendments where a decision causes injustice or problems. Judges are not required to give an entire account of their rationale behind decisions, and are shielded against public scrutiny and protected from legal repercussions. However judicial accountability can reinforce judicial independence as it could show that judges have proper reasons and rationales for arriving at a particular decision. Warren opines that while indirectly elected judges are not directly democratically accountable to the people, the key is for judges to achieve equilibrium between accountability and independence to ensure that justice is upheld. Judges are directly elected in some cases, including Mexican judicial elections, Bolivian judicial election and judicial elections in U.S. states. Judicial elections can increase political polarization. Judicial retention elections were found to have an impact on the accountability of judges.

== Internal judicial independence ==
Internal judicial independence is the autonomy of individual judges from undue influence within the judiciary itself—such as pressure from court leadership or senior colleagues over case assignment, panel composition, promotions, transfers, discipline, or informal guidance—so that adjudication rests solely on law and facts rather than intra-branch hierarchies.

In the Czech Republic, for example, scholarship has described how informal practices by senior judges (e.g., in appointments, panel design, and case assignment) may enhance expertise and uniformity yet blur internal checks, coining the term “superjudges.”

== Development ==
The development of judicial independence has been argued to involve a cycle of national law having an impact on international law, and international law subsequently impacting national law. This is said to occur in three phases: the first phase is characterized by the domestic development of the concept of judicial independence, the second by the spread of these concepts internationally and their implementation in international law, and the third by the implementation in national law of these newly formulated international principles of judicial independence.

A notable example illustrating this cycle is the United Kingdom. The first phase occurred in England with the original conception of judicial independence in the Act of Settlement 1701. The second phase was evident when England's concepts regarding judicial independence spread internationally, and were adopted into the domestic law of other countries; for instance, England served as the model for Montesquieu's separation of powers doctrine, and the Founding Fathers of the US Constitution used England as their dominant model in formulating the Constitution's Article III, which is the foundation of American judicial independence. Other common law countries, including Canada, Australia, and India, also adopted the British model of judicial independence.

In recent decades the third phase of judicial independence has been evident in the UK, as it has been significantly influenced by judicial independence principles developed by international human rights constitutional documents. The European Court of Human Rights (ECtHR) has had a significant impact on the conceptual analysis of judicial independence in England and Scotland. This process began in the 1990s with the ECtHR hearing UK cases and, more significantly, in the application of the European Convention on Human Rights in British law through the Human Rights Act 1998, which came into force in the UK in 2000.

Where British national law had previously impacted the international development of judicial independence, the British Constitutional Reform Act 2005 marked a shift, with international law now impacting British domestic law. The Constitutional Reform Act dramatically reformed government control over the administration of justice in England and Wales; importantly, it discontinued the position of the Lord Chancellor, one of the country's oldest constitutional offices, who was entrusted with a combination of legislative, executive, and judicial capacities. The Lord Chancellor served as speaker of the Upper House of Parliament, the House of Lords; as a member of the executive branch and member of the senior cabinet; and as the head of the judiciary. Historically, the appellate function had a connection with the executive branch due to the types of cases typically heard – impeachment and the hearing of felony charges against peers. The Constitutional Reform Act established new lines of demarcation between the Lord Chancellor and the judiciary, transferring all the judicial functions to the judiciary and entrusting the Lord Chancellor only with what are considered administrative and executive matters. In addition, the Constitutional Reform Act replaced the Lord Chancellor by the Lord Chief Justice as head of the judiciary, separated the judicial Appellate Committee of the House of Lords from the legislative parliament, reforming it as the Supreme Court, and creating a Judicial Appointments Commission. The creation of the Supreme Court was important, for it finally separated the highest court of appeal from the House of Lords.

Thus, the United Kingdom, where judicial independence began over three hundred years ago, illustrates the interaction over time of national and international law and jurisprudence in the area of judicial independence. In this process, concepts and ideas have become enriched as they have been implemented in successive judicial and political systems, as each system has enhanced and deepened the concepts and ideas it actualized. In addition to the UK, similar developments of conceptual cross-fertilization can be seen internationally, for example in European Union law, in civil law countries such as Austria, and in other common law jurisdictions including Canada.

In recent years, the principle of judicial independence has been described as one of the core values of the justice system.

== International standards ==
The International Association of Judicial Independence and World Peace produced the Mt. Scopus International Standards of Judicial Independence between 2007 and 2012. These built on the same association's New Delhi Minimum Standards on Judicial independence adopted in 1982 and their Montréal Universal Declaration on the Independence of Justice in 1983. Other influences they cite for the standards include the UN Basic Principles of Judicial Independence from 1985, the Burgh House Principles of Judicial Independence in International Law (for the international judiciary), Tokyo Law Asia Principles, Council of Europe Statements on judicial independence (particularly the Recommendation of the Committee of Ministers to Member States on the independence, efficiency and role of judges), the Bangalore Principles of Judicial Conduct 2002, and the American Bar Association's revision of its ethical standards for judges.

== Judicial independence metrics ==
Judicial independence metrics allow a quantitative analysis of judicial independence for individual countries. One judicial independence metric is the high court independence index in the V-Dem Dataset, where higher values indicate higher independence, shown below for individual countries.

Country	High court independence index for 2021
Afghanistan	-2.317
Albania	0.655
Algeria	-1.353
Angola	-0.294
Argentina	0.298
Armenia	0.739
Australia	2.873
Austria	2.736
Azerbaijan	-1.822
Bahrain	-2.57
Bangladesh	-1.607
Barbados	2.071
Belarus	-2.183
Belgium	2.497
Benin	0.319
Bhutan	1.586
Bolivia	-0.446
Bosnia and Herzegovina	0.706
Botswana	1.226
Brazil	1.936
Bulgaria	0.903
Burkina Faso	0.555
Myanmar	-0.897
Burundi	-1.064
Cambodia	-1.127
Cameroon	-1.646
Canada	2.145
Cape Verde	1.091
Central African Republic	-0.783
Chad	-1.542
Chile	3.091
China	-1.862
Colombia	1.539
Comoros	-0.236
Costa Rica	1.595
Croatia	1.305
Cuba	-0.469
Cyprus	1.204
Czech Republic	1.884
Democratic Republic of the Congo	-0.459
Denmark	3.21
Djibouti	-0.045
Dominican Republic	0.846
Ecuador	0.715
Egypt	0.208
El Salvador	-1.714
Equatorial Guinea	-2.554
Eritrea	-2.162
Estonia	2.404
Eswatini	-0.818
Ethiopia	-0.015
Fiji	-0.131
Finland	2.248
France	1.679
Gabon	-0.811
Georgia	-0.413
Germany	1.948
Ghana	1.149
Greece	1.388
Guatemala	1.104
Guinea	0.077
Guinea-Bissau	0.139
Guyana	1.32
Haiti	-0.583
Honduras	0.144
Hong Kong	-0.327
Hungary	1.082
Iceland	1.996
India	0.939
Indonesia	0.458
Iran	-1.093
Iraq	0.142
Ireland	2.271
Israel	1.238
Italy	1.593
Ivory Coast	-0.04
Jamaica	1.85
Japan	0.274
Jordan	-0.022
Kazakhstan	-1.355
Kenya	2.32
Kosovo	0.591
Kuwait	0.39
Kyrgyzstan	-1.393
Laos	1.496
Latvia	2.073
Lebanon	0.972
Lesotho	1.821
Liberia	1.208
Libya	0.185
Lithuania	2.162
Luxembourg	1.887
Madagascar	-1.707
Malawi	1.185
Malaysia	0.556
Maldives	0.712
Mali	1.087
Malta	1.629
Mauritania	-0.287
Mauritius	0.934
Mexico	0.143
Moldova	1.519
Mongolia	0.697
Montenegro	0.114
Morocco	1.745
Mozambique	0.063
Namibia	1.429
Nepal	0.853
Netherlands	2.497
New Zealand	2.979
Nicaragua	-3.156
Niger	0.592
Nigeria	0.779
North Korea	-3.279
North Macedonia	-0.439
Norway	2.819
Oman	-0.047
Pakistan	-0.07
Palestine (Gaza)	-0.566
Palestine (West Bank)	0.185
Panama	-0.027
Papua New Guinea	1.425
Paraguay	1.794
Peru	1.608
Philippines	0.144
Poland	1.027
Portugal	1.736
Qatar	-0.688
Republic of the Congo	-0.903
Romania	1.497
Russia	-2.498
Rwanda	-0.25
Sao Tome and Principe	1.058
Saudi Arabia	-1.086
Senegal	0.81
Serbia	0.424
Seychelles	1.934
Sierra Leone	0.953
Singapore	-0.193
Slovakia	0.911
Slovenia	2.189
Solomon Islands	1.606
Somalia	-1.512
Somaliland	-0.318
South Africa	1.487
South Korea	1.727
South Sudan	-1.627
Spain	2.426
Sri Lanka	1.528
Sudan	0.14
Suriname	1.455
Sweden	2.8
Switzerland	3.108
Syria	-1.039
Taiwan	0.963
Tajikistan	-1.729
Tanzania	1.333
Thailand	-0.25
The Gambia	1.249
Timor-Leste	1.039
Togo	-1.037
Trinidad and Tobago	1.512
Tunisia	2.193
Turkey	-0.609
Turkmenistan	-2.673
Uganda	0.301
Ukraine	-0.207
United Arab Emirates	-0.93
United Kingdom	1.943
United States of America	1.889
Uruguay	1.804
Uzbekistan	-1.901
Vanuatu	1.444
Venezuela	-2.258
Vietnam	-1.605
Yemen	-1.138
Zambia	0.401
Zanzibar	-0.13
Zimbabwe	-0.189

== Judicial independence by country ==
=== Australia ===
There was a struggle to establish judicial independence in colonial Australia, but by 1901 it was entrenched in the Australian constitution, including the separation of judicial power such that the High Court of Australia held in 2004 that all courts capable of exercising federal judicial power must be, and must appear to be, independent and impartial. Writing in 2007 Chief Justice of Australia Murray Gleeson stated that Australians largely took judicial independence for granted and the details were not matters of wide interest. No federal judge and only one supreme court judge has been removed for misconduct since 1901. Immunity from suit for judicial acts, security of tenure, and fixed remuneration are all established parts of judicial independence in Australia. The appointment of judges remains exclusively at the discretion of the executive which gives rise to concerns expressed that judicial appointments are political and made for political gain. Issues continue to arise in relation to dealing with judicial misconduct not warranting removal and incapacity of judges. In 2013 Chief Justice of NSW Tom Bathurst identified the way in which judicial and court performance was measured as one of the most substantial risks to the separation of powers in Australia.

=== Canada ===
Canada has a level of judicial independence entrenched in its Constitution, awarding superior court justices various guarantees to independence under sections 96 to 100 of the Constitution Act, 1867. These include right to tenure to age 75 and the right to a salary determined by the Parliament of Canada (as opposed to the executive). In 1982 a measure of judicial independence was extended to inferior courts specializing in criminal law (but not civil law) by section 11 of the Canadian Charter of Rights and Freedoms, although in the 1986 case Valente v. The Queen it was found these rights are limited. They do, however, involve tenure, financial security and some administrative control.

The year 1997 saw a major shift towards judicial independence, as the Supreme Court of Canada in the Provincial Judges Reference found an unwritten constitutional norm guaranteeing judicial independence to all judges, including civil law inferior court judges. The unwritten norm is said to be implied by the preamble to the Constitution Act, 1867. Consequently, judicial compensation committees such as the Judicial Compensation and Benefits Commission now recommend judicial salaries in Canada. There are two types of judicial independence: institutional independence and decisional independence. Institutional independence means the judicial branch is independent from the executive and legislative branches. Decisional independence is the idea that judges should be able to decide cases solely based on the law and facts, without letting the media, politics or other concerns sway their decisions, and without fearing penalty in their careers for their decisions.

=== China ===
Per the principle of unified state power, no judicial independence exists in the People's Republic of China. The Chinese Communist Party (CCP)'s Central Political and Legal Affairs Commission maintains effective control over the country's judicial system and its personnel. Since 2007, the judiciary must subordinate written law to the interests of the CCP under the "Three Supremes" doctrine. The CCP's 18th Central Committee reinforced that the law remains firmly under the party's control. In February 2023, the General Office of the Chinese Communist Party issued a text titled Opinions on Strengthening Legal Education and Legal Theory Research in the New Era that called for purging "Western erroneous views" from legal education, including constitutional government, separation of powers, and judicial independence.

==== Hong Kong ====
In Hong Kong, independence of the judiciary has been the tradition since the territory became a British crown colony in 1842. After the 1997 transfer of sovereignty of Hong Kong to the People's Republic of China pursuant to the Sino-British Joint Declaration, an international treaty registered with the United Nations, independence of the judiciary, along with continuation of English common law, has been enshrined in the territory's constitutional document, the Basic Law.

=== India ===
Judicial independence in India refers to the autonomy of the judiciary from the influence or interference of the executive and legislative branches of government. This principle is a cornerstone of the Indian Constitution and a fundamental feature of the country's democratic framework. It ensures that judges are free to make decisions based solely on law and justice, without any external pressures, thereby upholding the rule of law and protecting the rights of citizens.

==== Constitutional Provisions ====
The independence of the judiciary in India is enshrined in several provisions of the Constitution of India:

- Article 50 of the Directive Principles of State Policy urges the state to separate the judiciary from the executive in public services.
- Article 124 to 147 deal with the Supreme Court, while Articles 214 to 231 concern the High Courts. These provisions ensure security of tenure, fixed service conditions, and protection against arbitrary removal of judges.
- Article 121 and 211 prohibit the discussion of the conduct of judges in Parliament and State Legislatures, respectively, except in the context of impeachment.
- Article 368 provides the procedure for constitutional amendments but does not permit the curtailment of judicial independence.

==== Appointment and Tenure of Judges ====
Originally, the appointment of judges was carried out by the President in consultation with the Chief Justice of India and other senior judges. However, the Collegium System, evolved through Supreme Court judgments (notably the Second Judges Case in 1993), gave primacy to the judiciary (Specifically the CJI and two senior judges of Supreme Court) in appointments and transfers of judges. This system aims to preserve independence by insulating the appointment process from political interference.

Judges of the Supreme Court and High Courts enjoy security of tenure and can only be removed through a complex impeachment process requiring a two-thirds majority in both Houses of Parliament on grounds of proven misbehavior or incapacity (Article 124(4)).

==== Financial Independence ====
The Constitution also ensures financial independence by charging the salaries and allowances of Supreme Court and High Court judges to the Consolidated Fund of India or the respective states, meaning they are not subject to vote by the legislature.

==== Judicial Review and Activism ====
Judicial independence empowers courts to exercise judicial review, the authority to review laws and executive actions for their constitutionality. The Supreme Court, through landmark judgments such as Kesavananda Bharati v. State of Kerala (1973), upheld the Basic Structure Doctrine, preventing Parliament from altering the Constitution's essential features, including judicial independence.

Indian courts have also developed a tradition of judicial activism, particularly through Public Interest Litigations (PILs), allowing courts to act on behalf of the public good even in the absence of a traditional legal dispute.

==== During the Emergency (1975–1977) ====
One of the most significant tests of judicial independence in India occurred during the Emergency declared by Prime Minister Indira Gandhi from June 25, 1975, to March 21, 1977. Civil liberties were suspended, political opponents were jailed, and press freedom was severely curtailed. This period highlighted how the judiciary could be vulnerable to executive overreach—and how it responded under pressure.

===== The ADM Jabalpur Case (Habeas Corpus Case) =====
At the center of the judicial controversy during the Emergency was the ADM Jabalpur v. Shivkant Shukla (1976) case, commonly known as the Habeas Corpus case. The question before the Supreme Court was: Can a person challenge unlawful detention during the Emergency when the right to life and liberty under Article 21 has been suspended?

In a 4:1 majority judgment, the Supreme Court held that no person had the right to seek a writ of habeas corpus during the Emergency. This essentially gave the state unchecked power to detain individuals without trial. The lone dissent came from Justice H.R. Khanna, who famously ruled that "Even in absence of Article 21, the State has no power to deprive a person of life or liberty without authority of law." His courageous stand cost him the position of Chief Justice of India, as he was superseded in seniority.

This decision is widely regarded as a dark moment in Indian judicial history, where the judiciary was seen to have failed in its duty to protect fundamental rights.

===== Executive influence and supersession of judges =====
The Emergency also saw executive interference in judicial appointments. In several instances, senior judges were replaced by more pliant ones—particularly those seen as more favorable to the government. This practice undermined the convention of seniority and was viewed as a direct attack on the independence of the judiciary.

Justice A.N. Ray, who sided with the majority in the Kesavananda Bharati case but dissented from the majority in the Bank Nationalization case, was appointed Chief Justice of India by superseding three senior judges in 1973—an event often seen as a precursor to the erosion of judicial independence during the Emergency.

===== Legacy and reassessment =====
After the Emergency ended and the Janata Party came to power, there was widespread introspection. The ADM Jabalpur judgement was heavily criticized, and many later Supreme Court decisions essentially overruled it in spirit, even if not formally.

In 2017, the Supreme Court in the K.S. Puttaswamy v. Union of India (privacy case) declared the ADM Jabalpur ruling to be "seriously flawed" and overruled it explicitly. The judgement reaffirmed that fundamental rights cannot be suspended even in times of crisis, thereby restoring the dignity of judicial independence.

=== Singapore ===
Judicial independence in Singapore is protected by the Constitution of Singapore, statutes such as the State Courts Act and Supreme Court of Judicature Act, and the common law. To safeguard judicial independence, Singapore law lays down special procedures to be followed before the conduct of Supreme Court judges may be discussed in Parliament and for their removal from office for misconduct, and provides that their remuneration may not be reduced during their tenure. By statute, judicial officers of the State Courts, and the Registrar, Deputy Registrar and assistant registrars of the Supreme Court have immunity from civil suits, and are prohibited from hearing and deciding cases in which they are personally interested. The common law provides similar protections and disabilities for Supreme Court judges.

The Chief Justice and other Supreme Court judges are appointed by the President of Singapore acting on the advice of the Cabinet of Singapore. The President must consult the Chief Justice when appointing other judges, and may exercise personal discretion to refuse to make an appointment if he does not concur with the Cabinet's advice. Supreme Court justices enjoy security of tenure up to the age of 65 years, after which they cease to hold office. However, the Constitution permits such judges to be re-appointed on a term basis.

=== Taiwan ===
Articles 80 and 81 of the Constitution require judges to adjudicate independently and grant them tenure for life. The Judges Act of 2011 gives these guarantees statutory form. It permits administrative supervision of judges only to the extent that it does not affect judicial independence, allows a judge to challenge supervisory measures before the Disciplinary Chamber of the Judiciary, and assigns the annual allocation of cases within each court to a council of its judges. Drawing on archival research and interviews with judges, the scholar Hsu Ching-fang has argued that judicial independence in Taiwan was built through such internal mechanisms, which developed through both collective action by reform-minded judges and top-down reform by the judicial administration.

=== United Kingdom ===
==== History in England and Wales ====
During the Middle Ages, under the Norman monarchy of the Kingdom of England, the king and his Curia Regis held judicial power. Judicial independence began to emerge during the early modern period; more courts were created and a judicial profession grew. By the fifteenth century, the king's role in this feature of government became small. Nevertheless, kings could still influence courts and dismiss judges. The Stuart dynasty used this power frequently in order to overpower the Parliament of England. After the Stuarts were removed in the Glorious Revolution of 1688, some advocated guarding against royal manipulation of the judiciary. King William III approved the Act of Settlement 1701, which established tenure for judges unless Parliament removed them.

==== Contemporary usage ====
Under the uncodified British Constitution, there are two important conventions which help to preserve judicial independence. The first is that the Parliament of the United Kingdom does not comment on the cases which are before the court. The second is the principle of parliamentary privilege: that Members of Parliament are protected from prosecution in certain circumstances by the courts.

Furthermore, the independence of the judiciary is guaranteed by the Constitutional Reform Act 2005. In order to try to promote the independence of the judiciary, the selection process is designed to minimize political interference. The process focuses on senior members of the judiciary rather than on politicians. Part 2 of the Tribunals, Courts and Enforcement Act 2007 aims to increase diversity among the judiciary.

The pay of judges is determined by an independent pay review body. It makes recommendations to the government after taking evidence from a variety of sources. The government accepts these recommendations and will traditionally implement them fully. As long as judges hold their positions in "good order", they remain in post until they wish to retire or until they reach the mandatory retirement age of 70.

Until 1 January 2010, the legal profession was self-regulating; with responsibility for implementing and enforcing its own professional standards and disciplining its own members. The bodies which performed this function were the Bar Council and the Law Society. However, this self-regulation came to an end when approved regulators came under the regulation of the Legal Services Board, composed of non-lawyers, following the passage of the Legal Services Act 2007. This saw the establishment of the Solicitors Regulation Authority to regulate solicitors and the Bar Standards Board to regulate barristers.

=== United States ===
==== Federal courts ====
Article III of the United States Constitution establishes the federal courts as part of the federal government.

The Constitution provides that federal judges, including judges of the Supreme Court of the United States, are appointed by the President "by and with the advice and consent of the Senate". Once appointed, federal judges:

...both of the supreme and inferior Courts, shall hold their Offices during good Behavior, and shall, at stated Times, receive for their Services a Compensation which shall not be diminished during their Continuance in Office.

Federal judges vacate office only upon death, resignation, or impeachment and removal from office by Congress; only 13 federal judges have been impeached as of 2025. The phrase "during good behavior" predates the Declaration of Independence. John Adams equated it with quamdiu se bene gesserint in a letter to the Boston Gazette published on 11 January 1773, a phrase that first appeared in section 3 of the Act of Settlement 1701 in England.

The president, while free to appoint any person to the federal bench, typically consults with the American Bar Association, whose Standing Committee on the Federal Judiciary rates each nominee "Well Qualified", "Qualified" or "Not Qualified".

==== State courts ====
State courts deal with independence of the judiciary in many ways, and several forms of judicial selection are used for both trial courts and appellate courts (including state supreme courts), varying between states and sometimes within states. In some states, judges are elected (sometime on a partisan ballot, other times on a nonpartisan one), while in others they are appointed by the governor or state legislature.

The 2000 case of Bush v. Gore, in which a majority of the Supreme Court, including some appointees of President George H. W. Bush, overruled challenges to the election of George W. Bush then pending in the Florida Supreme Court, whose members had all been appointed by Democratic governors, is seen by many as reinforcing the need for judicial independence, both with regard to the Florida Supreme Court and the US Supreme Court. This case has increased focus and attention on judicial outcomes as opposed to the traditional focus on judicial qualifications.

== See also ==
- Algorithmic transparency
- Central bank independence
- Civil control of the military
- Civil service independence
- Consent of the governed
- Constitutional patriotism
- Constitutionalism
- Counter-majoritarian difficulty
- Editorial independence
- Independent media
- Indeterminacy debate in legal theory
- Judiciary corruption
- Judicial discretion
- Judicial immunity
- Judicial interpretation
- Judicial populism
- Kritarchy
- Liberal legalism
- Miscarriage of justice
- Open government
- List of national legal systems
- Regulatory capture
- Responsible government
- Political question
- Political naturalism
- Rule according to higher law
  - Primacy of European Union law
  - Supremacy Clause (USA)
- Rule of law
- Salus populi suprema lex esto
- Separation of church and state
- Social contract
- Statutory interpretation
