= Classical republicanism =

Subideology of republicanism formed during the Renaissance era

Classical republicanism, also known as civic republicanism or civic humanism, is a form of republicanism developed in the Renaissance inspired by the governmental forms and writings of classical antiquity, especially such classical writers as Aristotle, Polybius, and Cicero. Classical republicanism is built around concepts such as liberty as non-domination, self-government, rule of law, property-based personality, anti-corruption, abolition of monarchy, civics, civil society, common good, civic virtue, civic participation, popular sovereignty, patriotism and mixed government.

== Overview ==
In the classical period itself the term republicanism did not exist, but the Latin term res publica, which translates literally as "the public thing" or "the public affair", was in usage. There were a number of theorists who wrote on political philosophy during that period such as Aristotle (Politics), Polybius (Histories) and Cicero (De re publica and De Officiis), and their ideas became the essential core of classical republicanism. The ideology of republicanism blossomed during the Italian Renaissance, most notably in Florence, when a number of authors looked back to the classical period and used its examples to formulate ideas about ideal governance. In the late 13th century the Italian Dominican Bartholomew of Lucca, when completing Thomas Aquinas’s De regno, defended republicanism against monarchy and the autonomy of the Tuscan communes, and reconfirmed, against Augustine, Roman republican values such as patriotism. One of the first to reintroduce classical republicanism was said to have been Niccolò Machiavelli (1469–1527) in his later reflections.

It has been argued that Machiavelli was not a classical republican, since he described mostly medieval political relations. Indeed, Machiavelli's innovation, addition, or transformation of classical republicanism more likely marks a turning point and the dawn of modern republicanism; Machiavelli's particular brand of republicanism has been dubbed "rapacious republicanism" by a collection of scholars. At any rate, that classical republicanism actually refers to a philosophy developed primarily in the early modern period is acknowledged by many scholars to be confusing; therefore, some now use the term early modern republicanism to cover this branch of political thought. To be sure, the conceptual, historical, and philosophical debate continues.

One variant of classical republicanism is known as "civic humanism", a term first employed by the German scholar of late medieval and early modern Italian history, Hans Baron. Although in certain cases and with certain scholars there is a subtle distinction between the two, they are for all intents and purposes interchangeable. Civic humanism is slightly wider in scope and stresses the central role of civic virtue in the preservation of the classically Roman/Florentine ideal of political liberty. Leading exponents of this dual concept are Hannah Arendt, J. G. A. Pocock, Quentin Skinner, and Philip Pettit.

Thomas Pangle (a student of Leo Strauss) has critiqued the inaccuracy of the "civic humanist" reconstruction, regarding it as a distortion of classical republicanism on the one hand and of Machiavelli's political science on the other hand. Pangle writes, "both Pocock and Arendt (the latter more self-consciously) obscure the imperialism, the ruthlessness, the warring hierarchy, and the glacial rationalism that truly characterize Machiavelli; over these elements they throw a veil of softened, egalitarian, 'civic humanism'".

According to Baron, for many years the foremost expert on the development of classical republicanism, the ideology was a product of the long conflict between Florence and Milan. Florence was ruled by its commercial elites while Milan was a monarchy controlled by its landed aristocracy. The Florentines asserted that their form of government was superior on the basis that it was more similar to that of the Greeks and the Roman Republic. Moreover, Leonardo Bruni (1370–1444) asserted, based on Tacitus's pronouncements in the introduction to the Histories, that republican government made better men, whereas monarchy was inimical to human virtue (see Tacitean studies). The Florentine ideal developed into the ideology of civic humanism, as per Baron.

Since Thomas Hobbes, at the core of republicanism is the concept of the social contract. Although modern republicanism rejected monarchy (whether hereditary or otherwise autocratic) in favour of rule by the people, classical republicanism treated monarchy as one form of government among others. Classical republicanism was rather aimed against any form of tyranny, whether monarchic, aristocratic, or democratic (tyranny of the majority). The notions of what constituted an ideal republic to classical republicans themselves depended on personal view. However, the most ideal republic featured a form of mixed government and was based on the pursuit of civility.

Most controversial is the classical republican view of liberty and how, or if, this view differed from that later developed by liberalism. Previously, many scholars accepted the stance of Isaiah Berlin that republicanism was tilted more toward positive liberty rather than the negative liberty characterizing liberalism. In recent years, this thesis has been challenged, and Philip Pettit argues that republican liberty is based upon "non-domination" while liberal freedom is based upon "non-interference." Another view is that liberalism views liberty as pre-social while classical republicans saw true liberty as a product of society. Because liberty was an important part of republican thought, many republican thinkers were appropriated by the theory of classical liberalism.

Classical republicanism became extremely popular in Classicism and during the Enlightenment, playing a central role in the thought of political philosophy since Hobbes, through John Locke, Giambattista Vico, Montesquieu, Rousseau, until Kant. Some historians have seen classical republican ideas influencing early American political thought.

== Historical development ==
=== Classical antecedents ===
==== Ancient Greece ====
Sculpture of Aristotle

In Ancient Greece, several philosophers and historians analysed and described elements we now recognize as classical republicanism. Traditionally, the Greek concept of "politeia" was rendered into Latin as res publica. Consequently, political theory until relatively recently often used republic in the general sense of "regime". There is no single written expression or definition from this era that exactly corresponds with a modern understanding of the term "republic" but most of the essential features of the modern definition are present in the works of Plato, Aristotle, and Polybius. These include theories of mixed government and of civic virtue. For example, in The Republic, Plato places great emphasis on the importance of civic virtue (aiming for the good) together with personal virtue ('just man') on the part of the ideal rulers. Indeed, in Book V, Plato asserts that until rulers have the nature of philosophers (Socrates) or philosophers become the rulers, there can be no civic peace or happiness.

A number of Ancient Greek city-states such as Athens and Sparta have been classified as "classical republics", because they featured extensive participation by the citizens in legislation and political decision-making. Aristotle considered Carthage to have been a republic as it had a political system similar to that of some of the Greek cities, notably Sparta, but avoided some of the defects that affected them.

==== Ancient Rome ====
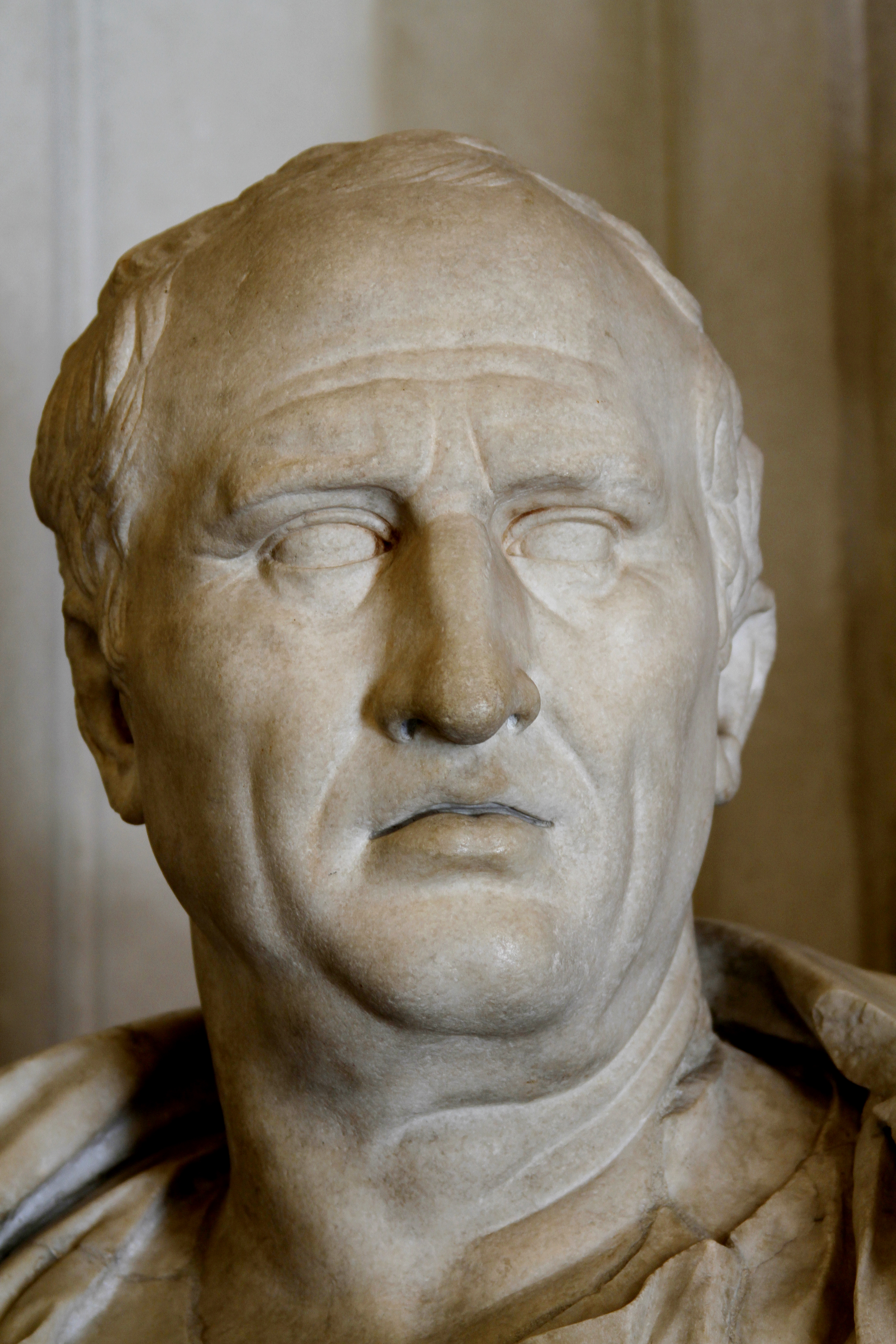
Sculpture of Cicero

Both Livy, a Roman historian, and Plutarch, who is noted for his biographies and moral essays, described how Rome had developed its legislation, notably the transition from a kingdom to a republic, by following the example of the Greeks. Some of this history, composed more than 500 years after the events, with scant written sources to rely on, may be fictitious reconstruction.

The Greek historian Polybius, writing in the mid-2nd century BCE, emphasized (in Book 6) the role played by the Roman Republic as an institutional form in the dramatic rise of Rome's hegemony over the Mediterranean. In his writing on the constitution of the Roman Republic, Polybius described the system as being a "mixed" form of government. Specifically, Polybius described the Roman system as a mixture of monarchy, aristocracy, and democracy with the Roman Republic constituted in such a manner that it applied the strengths of each system to offset the weaknesses of the others. In his view, the mixed system of the Roman Republic provided the Romans with a much greater level of domestic tranquillity than would have been experienced under another form of government. Furthermore, Polybius argued, the comparative level of domestic tranquillity the Romans enjoyed allowed them to conquer the Mediterranean. Polybius exerted a great influence on Cicero as he wrote his politico-philosophical works in the 1st century BCE. In one of these works, De re publica, Cicero linked the Roman concept of res publica to the Greek politeia.

The modern term "republic", despite its derivation, is not synonymous with the Roman res publica. Among the several meanings of the term res publica, it is most often translated "republic" where the Latin expression refers to the Roman state, and its form of government, between the era of the Kings and the era of the Emperors. This Roman Republic would, by a modern understanding of the word, still be defined as a true republic, even if not coinciding entirely. Thus, Enlightenment philosophers saw the Roman Republic as an ideal system because it included features like a systematic separation of powers.

Romans still called their state "Res Publica" in the era of the early emperors because, on the surface, the organization of the state had been preserved by the first emperors without significant alteration. Several offices from the Republican era, held by individuals, were combined under the control of a single person. These changes became permanent, and gradually conferred sovereignty on the Emperor.

Cicero's description of the ideal state, in De re Publica, does not equate to a modern-day "republic"; it is more like enlightened absolutism. His philosophical works were influential when Enlightenment philosophers such as Voltaire developed their political concepts.

In its classical meaning, a republic was any stable well-governed political community. Both Plato and Aristotle identified three forms of government: democracy, aristocracy, and monarchy. First Plato and Aristotle, and then Polybius and Cicero, held that the ideal republic is a mixture of these three forms of government. The writers of the Renaissance embraced this notion.

Cicero expressed reservations concerning the republican form of government. While in his theoretical works he defended monarchy, or at least a mixed monarchy/oligarchy, in his own political life, he generally opposed men, like Julius Caesar, Mark Antony, and Octavian, who were trying to realise such ideals. Eventually, that opposition led to his death and Cicero can be seen as a victim of his own Republican ideals.

Tacitus, a contemporary of Plutarch, was not concerned with whether a form of government could be analysed as a "republic" or a "monarchy". He analysed how the powers accumulated by the early Julio-Claudian dynasty were all given by a State that was still notionally a republic. Nor was the Roman Republic "forced" to give away these powers: it did so freely and reasonably, certainly in Augustus' case, because of his many services to the state, freeing it from civil wars and disorder.

Tacitus was one of the first to ask whether such powers were given to the head of state because the citizens wanted to give them, or whether they were given for other reasons (for example, because one had a deified ancestor). The latter case led more easily to abuses of power. In Tacitus' opinion, the trend away from a true republic was irreversible only when Tiberius established power, shortly after Augustus' death in 14 CE (much later than most historians place the start of the Imperial form of government in Rome). By this time, too many principles defining some powers as "untouchable" had been implemented.

=== Renaissance republicanism ===
Portrait of Niccolò Machiavelli

In Europe, republicanism was revived in the late Middle Ages when a number of states, which arose from medieval communes, embraced a republican system of government. These were generally small but wealthy trading states in which the merchant class had risen to prominence. Knud Haakonssen notes that by the Renaissance, Europe was divided, such that those states controlled by a landed elite were monarchies, and those controlled by a commercial elite were republics. The latter included the Italian city-states of Florence, Genoa, and Venice and members of the Hanseatic League. One notable exception was Dithmarschen, a group of largely autonomous villages, which confederated in a peasants' republic. Building upon concepts of medieval feudalism, Renaissance scholars used the ideas of the ancient world to advance their view of an ideal government. Thus the republicanism developed during the Renaissance is known as 'classical republicanism' because it relied on classical models. This terminology was developed by Zera Fink in the 1940s, but some modern scholars, such as Brugger, consider it confuses the "classical republic" with the system of government used in the ancient world. 'Early modern republicanism' has been proposed as an alternative term. It is also sometimes called civic humanism. Beyond simply a non-monarchy, early modern thinkers conceived of an ideal republic, in which mixed government was an important element, and the notion that virtue and the common good were central to good government. Republicanism also developed its own distinct view of liberty. Renaissance authors who spoke highly of republics were rarely critical of monarchies. While Niccolò Machiavelli's Discourses on Livy is the period's key work on republics, he also wrote the treatise The Prince, which is better remembered and more widely read, on how best to run a monarchy. The early modern writers did not see the republican model as universally applicable; most thought that it could be successful only in very small and highly urbanized city-states. Jean Bodin in Six Books of the Commonwealth (1576) identified monarchy with republic.

Classical writers like Tacitus, and Renaissance writers like Machiavelli tried to avoid an outspoken preference for one government system or another. Enlightenment philosophers, on the other hand, expressed a clear opinion. Thomas More, writing before the Age of Enlightenment, was too outspoken for the reigning king's taste, even though he coded his political preferences in a utopian allegory.

In England a type of republicanism evolved that was not wholly opposed to monarchy; thinkers such as Thomas More, John Fisher and Sir Thomas Smith saw a monarchy, firmly constrained by law, as compatible with republicanism.

==== Dutch Republic ====
Anti-monarchism became more strident in the Dutch Republic during and after the Eighty Years' War, which began in 1568. This anti-monarchism was more propaganda than a political philosophy; most of the anti-monarchist works appeared in the form of widely distributed pamphlets. This evolved into a systematic critique of monarchy, written by men such as the brothers Johan and Peter de la Court. They saw all monarchies as illegitimate tyrannies that were inherently corrupt. These authors were more concerned with preventing the position of Stadholder from evolving into a monarchy, than with attacking their former rulers. Dutch republicanism also influenced French Huguenots during the Wars of Religion. In the other states of early modern Europe republicanism was more moderate.

==== Polish–Lithuanian Commonwealth ====
In the Polish–Lithuanian Commonwealth, republicanism was the influential ideology. After the establishment of the Commonwealth of Two Nations, republicans supported the status quo, of having a very weak monarch, and opposed those who thought a stronger monarchy was needed. These mostly Polish republicans, such as Łukasz Górnicki, Andrzej Wolan, and Stanisław Konarski, were well read in classical and Renaissance texts and firmly believed that their state was a republic on the Roman model, and started to call their state the Rzeczpospolita. Atypically, Polish–Lithuanian republicanism was not the ideology of the commercial class, but rather of the landed nobility, which would lose power if the monarchy were expanded. This resulted in an oligarchy of the great landed magnates.

=== Enlightenment republicanism ===
==== Caribbean ====
Victor Hugues, Jean-Baptiste Raymond de Lacrosse and Nicolas Xavier de Ricard were prominent supporters of republicanism for various Caribbean islands. Edwin Sandys, William Sayle and George Tucker all supported the islands becoming republics, particularly Bermuda. Julien Fédon and Joachim Philip led the republican Fédon's rebellion between 2 March 1795 and 19 June 1796, an uprising against British rule in Grenada.

==== Corsica ====
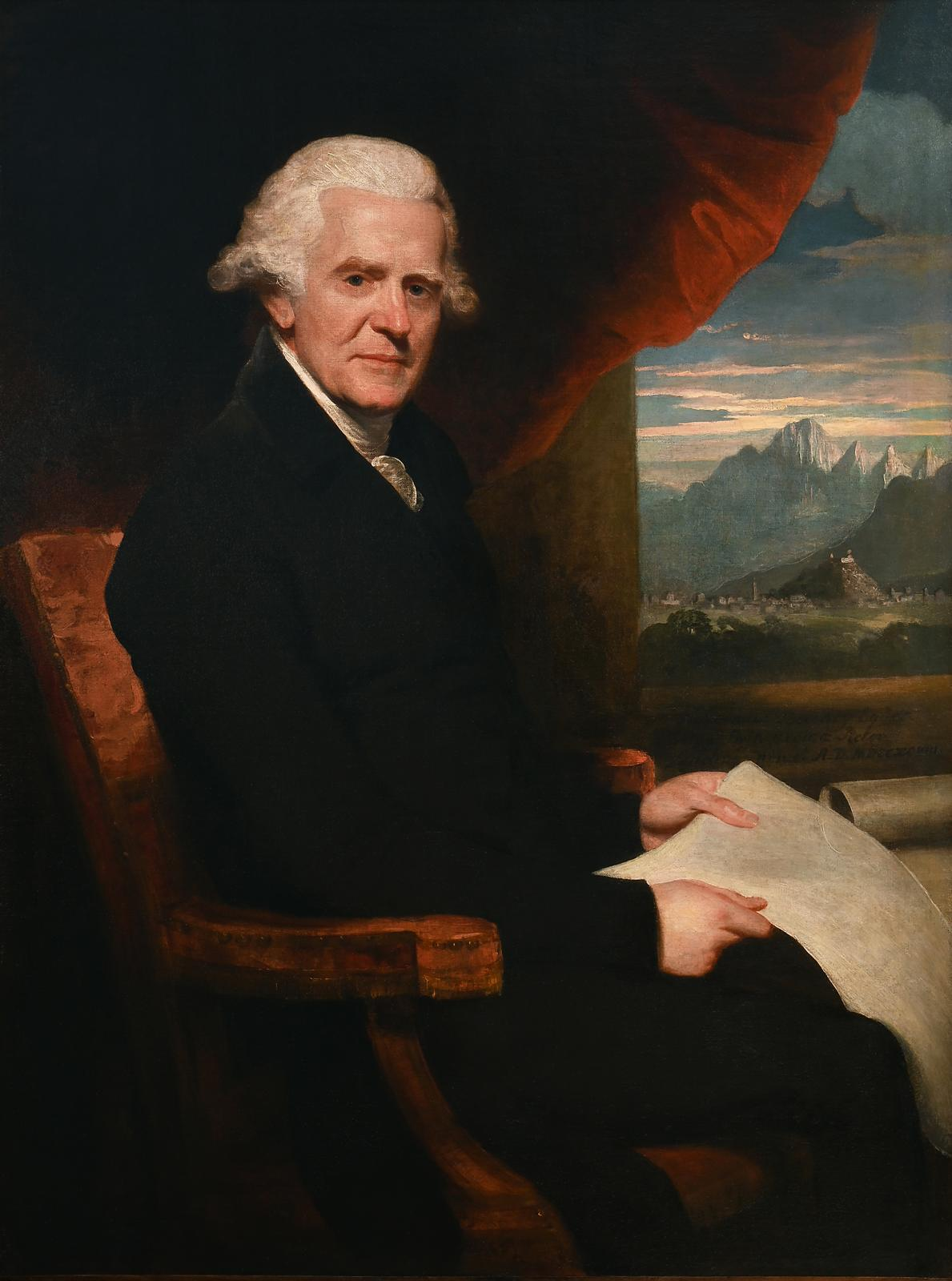
Portrait of Pasquale Paoli

The first of the Enlightenment republics established in Europe during the 18th century occurred in the small Mediterranean island of Corsica. Although perhaps an unlikely place to act as a laboratory for such political experiments, Corsica combined a number of factors that made it unique: a tradition of village democracy; varied cultural influences from the Italian city-states, Spanish Empire and Kingdom of France which left it open to the ideas of the Italian Renaissance, Spanish humanism and French Enlightenment; and a geo-political position between these three competing powers which led to frequent power vacuums in which new regimes could be set up, testing out the fashionable new ideas of the age.

From the 1720s the island had been experiencing a series of short-lived but ongoing rebellions against its current sovereign, the Italian city-state of Genoa. During the initial period (1729–36) these merely sought to restore the control of the Spanish Empire; when this proved impossible, an independent Kingdom of Corsica (1736–40) was proclaimed, following the Enlightenment ideal of a written constitutional monarchy. But the perception grew that the monarchy had colluded with the invading power, a more radical group of reformers led by the Pasquale Paoli pushed for political overhaul, in the form of a constitutional and parliamentary republic inspired by the popular ideas of the Enlightenment.

Its governing philosophy was both inspired by the prominent thinkers of the day, notably the French philosophers Montesquieu and Voltaire and the Swiss theorist Jean-Jacques Rousseau. Not only did it include a permanent national parliament with fixed-term legislatures and regular elections, but, more radically for the time, it introduced universal male suffrage, and it is thought to be the first constitution in the world to grant women the right to vote female suffrage may also have existed. It also extended Enlightened principles to other spheres, including administrative reform, the foundation of a national university at Corte, and the establishment of a popular standing army.

The Corsican Republic lasted for fifteen years, from 1755 to 1769, eventually falling to a combination of Genoese and French forces and was incorporated as a province of the Kingdom of France. But the episode resonated across Europe as an early example of Enlightened constitutional republicanism, with many of the most prominent political commentators of the day recognising it to be an experiment in a new type of popular and democratic government. Its influence was particularly notable among the French Enlightenment philosophers: Rousseau's famous work On the Social Contract (1762: chapter 10, book II) declared, in its discussion on the conditions necessary for a functional popular sovereignty, that "There is still one European country capable of making its own laws: the island of Corsica. valour and persistency with which that brave people has regained and defended its liberty well deserves that some wise man should teach it how to preserve what it has won. I have a feeling that some day that little island will astonish Europe."; indeed Rousseau volunteered to do precisely that, offering a draft constitution for Paoli'se use. Similarly, Voltaire affirmed in his Précis du siècle de Louis XV (1769: chapter LX) that "Bravery may be found in many places, but such bravery only among free peoples". But the influence of the Corsican Republic as an example of a sovereign people fighting for liberty and enshrining this constitutionally in the form of an Enlightened republic was even greater among the Radicals of Great Britain and North America, where it was popularised via An Account of Corsica, by the Scottish essayist James Boswell. The Corsican Republic went on to influence the American revolutionaries ten years later: the Sons of Liberty, initiators of the American Revolution, would declare Pascal Paoli to be a direct inspiration for their own struggle against the British; the son of Ebenezer Mackintosh was named Pascal Paoli Mackintosh in his honour, and no fewer than five American counties are named Paoli for the same reason.

==== England ====
Portrait of Oliver Cromwell

Oliver Cromwell set up a Christian republic called the Commonwealth of England (1649–1660) which he ruled after the overthrow of King Charles I. James Harrington was then a leading philosopher of republicanism. John Milton was another important Republican thinker at this time, expressing his views in political tracts as well as through poetry and prose. In his epic poem Paradise Lost, for instance, Milton uses Satan's fall to suggest that unfit monarchs should be brought to justice, and that such issues extend beyond the constraints of one nation. As Christopher N. Warren argues, Milton offers "a language to critique imperialism, to question the legitimacy of dictators, to defend free international discourse, to fight unjust property relations, and to forge new political bonds across national lines." This form of international Miltonic republicanism has been influential on later thinkers including 19th-century radicals Karl Marx and Friedrich Engels, according to Warren and other historians.

The collapse of the Commonwealth of England in 1660 and the restoration of the monarchy under Charles II discredited republicanism among England's ruling circles. Nevertheless, they welcomed the liberalism, and emphasis on rights, of John Locke, which played a major role in the Glorious Revolution of 1688. Even so, republicanism flourished in the "country" party of the early 18th century (commonwealthmen), which denounced the corruption of the "court" party, producing a political theory that heavily influenced the American colonists. In general, the English ruling classes of the 18th century vehemently opposed republicanism, typified by the attacks on John Wilkes, and especially on the American Revolution and the French Revolution.

==== French and Swiss thought ====
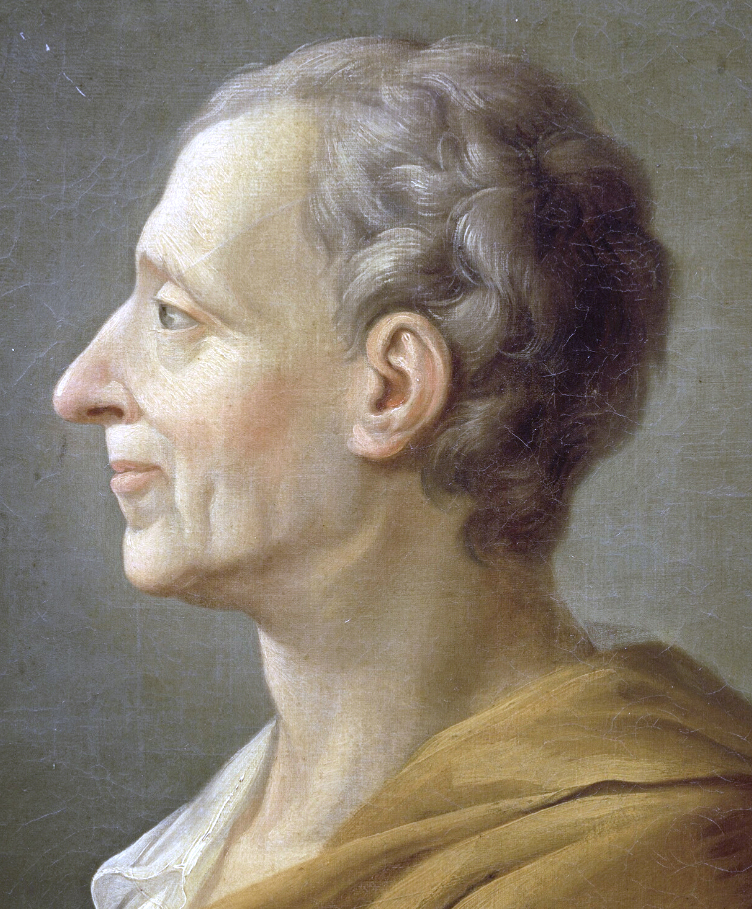
Portrait of Montesquieu

French and Swiss Enlightenment thinkers, such as Voltaire, Baron Charles de Montesquieu and later Jean-Jacques Rousseau, expanded upon and altered the ideas of what an ideal republic should be: some of their new ideas were scarcely traceable to antiquity or the Renaissance thinkers. Concepts they contributed, or heavily elaborated, were social contract, positive law, and mixed government. They also borrowed from, and distinguished republicanism from, the ideas of liberalism that were developing at the same time.

Liberalism and republicanism were frequently conflated during this period, because they both opposed absolute monarchy. Modern scholars see them as two distinct streams that both contributed to the democratic ideals of the modern world. An important distinction is that, while republicanism stressed the importance of civic virtue and the common good, liberalism was based on economics and individualism. It is clearest in the matter of private property, which, according to some, can be maintained only under the protection of established positive law.

Jules Ferry, Prime Minister of France from 1880 to 1885, followed both these schools of thought. He eventually enacted the Ferry Laws, which he intended to overturn the Falloux Laws by embracing the anti-clerical thinking of the Philosophes. These laws ended the Catholic Church's involvement in many government institutions in late 19th-century France, including schools.

==== The Thirteen British Colonies in North America ====
In recent years a debate has developed over the role of republicanism in the American Revolution and in the British radicalism of the 18th century. For many decades the consensus was that liberalism, especially that of John Locke, was paramount and that republicanism had a distinctly secondary role.

The new interpretations were pioneered by J.G.A. Pocock, who argued in The Machiavellian Moment (1975) that, at least in the early 18th century, republican ideas were just as important as liberal ones. Pocock's view is now widely accepted. Bernard Bailyn and Gordon Wood pioneered the argument that the American founding fathers were more influenced by republicanism than they were by liberalism. Cornell University professor Isaac Kramnick, on the other hand, argues that Americans have always been highly individualistic and therefore Lockean. Joyce Appleby has argued similarly for the Lockean influence on America.

In the decades before the American Revolution (1776), the intellectual and political leaders of the colonies studied history intently, looking for models of good government. They especially followed the development of republican ideas in England. Pocock explained the intellectual sources in America:

The Whig canon and the neo-Harringtonians, John Milton, James Harrington and Sidney, Trenchard, Gordon and Bolingbroke, together with the Greek, Roman, and Renaissance masters of the tradition as far as Montesquieu, formed the authoritative literature of this culture; and its values and concepts were those with which we have grown familiar: a civic and patriot ideal in which the personality was founded in property, perfected in citizenship but perpetually threatened by corruption; government figuring paradoxically as the principal source of corruption and operating through such means as patronage, faction, standing armies (opposed to the ideal of the militia), established churches (opposed to the Puritan and deist modes of American religion) and the promotion of a monied interest – though the formulation of this last concept was somewhat hindered by the keen desire for readily available paper credit common in colonies of settlement. A neoclassical politics provided both the ethos of the elites and the rhetoric of the upwardly mobile, and accounts for the singular cultural and intellectual homogeneity of the Founding Fathers and their generation.

The commitment of most Americans to these republican values made the American Revolution inevitable. Britain was increasingly seen as corrupt and hostile to republicanism, and as a threat to the established liberties the Americans enjoyed.

Leopold von Ranke in 1848 claimed that American republicanism played a crucial role in the development of European liberalism:

By abandoning English constitutionalism and creating a new republic based on the rights of the individual, the North Americans introduced a new force in the world. Ideas spread most rapidly when they have found adequate concrete expression. Thus republicanism entered our Romanic/Germanic world.... Up to this point, the conviction had prevailed in Europe that monarchy best served the interests of the nation. Now the idea spread that the nation should govern itself. But only after a state had actually been formed on the basis of the theory of representation did the full significance of this idea become clear. All later revolutionary movements have this same goal... This was the complete reversal of a principle. Until then, a king who ruled by the grace of God had been the center around which everything turned. Now the idea emerged that power should come from below.... These two principles are like two opposite poles, and it is the conflict between them that determines the course of the modern world. In Europe the conflict between them had not yet taken on concrete form; with the French Revolution it did.

==== Républicanisme ====
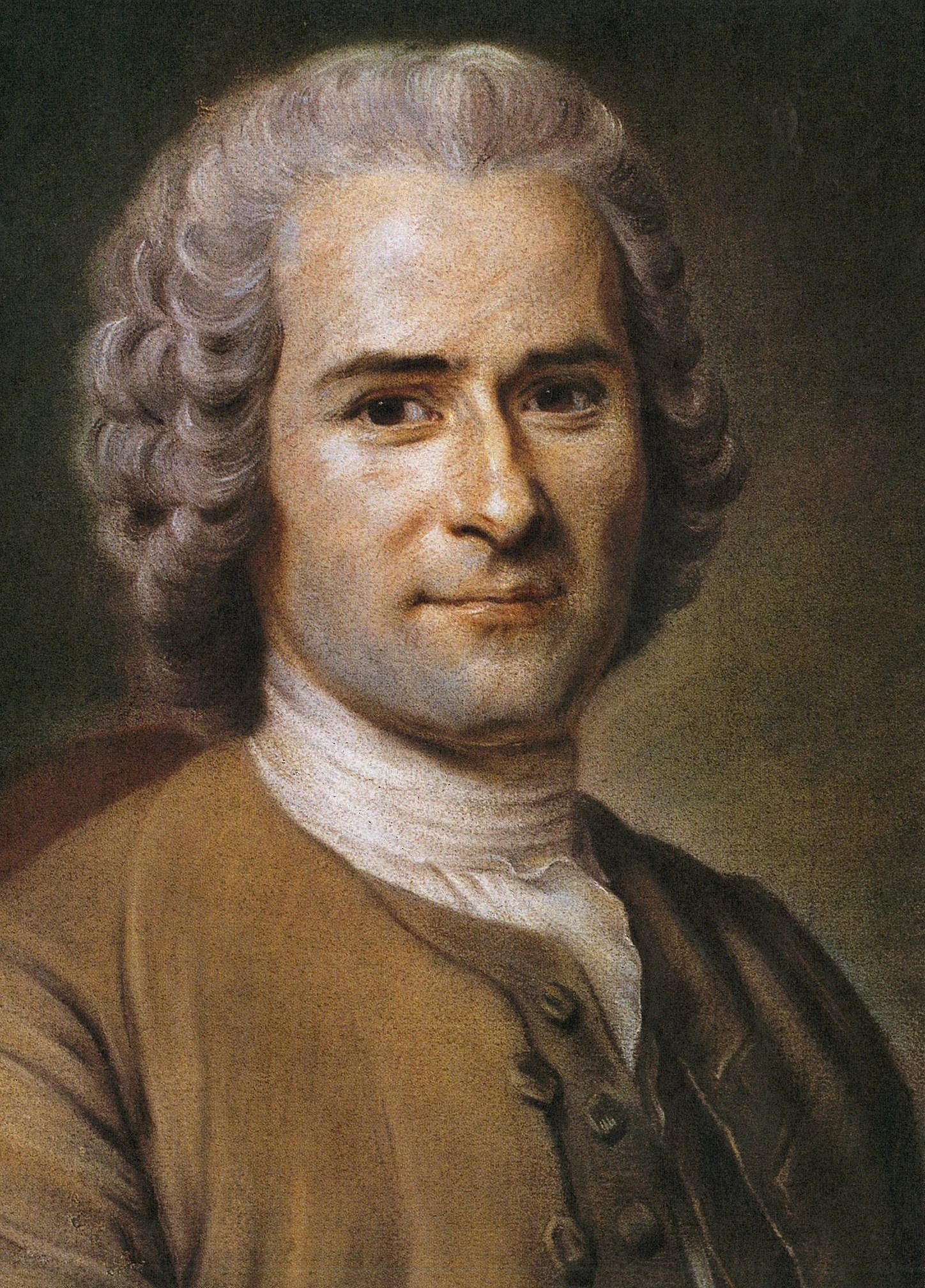
Portrait of Jean-Jacques Rousseau

Republicanism, especially that of Rousseau, played a central role in the French Revolution and foreshadowed modern republicanism. The revolutionaries, after overthrowing the French monarchy in the 1790s, began by setting up a republic; Napoleon converted it into an Empire with a new aristocracy. In the 1830s Belgium adopted some of the innovations of the progressive political philosophers of the Enlightenment.

Républicanisme is a French version of modern republicanism. It is a form of social contract, deduced from Jean-Jacques Rousseau's idea of a general will. Each citizen is engaged in a direct relationship with the state, removing the need for identity politics based on local, religious, or racial identification.

Républicanisme, in theory, makes anti-discrimination laws unnecessary, though some critics may argue that in republics also, colour-blind laws serve to perpetuate discrimination.

==== Ireland ====
Inspired by the American and French Revolutions, the Society of United Irishmen was founded in 1791 in Belfast and Dublin. The inaugural meeting of the United Irishmen in Belfast on 18 October 1791 approved a declaration of the society's objectives. It identified the central grievance that Ireland had no national government: "...we are ruled by Englishmen, and the servants of Englishmen, whose object is the interest of another country, whose instrument is corruption, and whose strength is the weakness of Ireland..." They adopted three central positions: (i) to seek out a cordial union among all the people of Ireland, to maintain that balance essential to preserve liberties and extend commerce; (ii) that the sole constitutional mode by which English influence can be opposed, is by a complete and radical reform of the representation of the people in Parliament; (iii) that no reform is practicable or efficacious, or just which shall not include Irishmen of every religious persuasion. The declaration, then, urged constitutional reform, union among Irish people and the removal of all religious disqualifications.

The movement was influenced, at least in part, by the French Revolution. Public interest, already strongly aroused, was brought to a pitch by the publication in 1790 of Edmund Burke's Reflections on the Revolution in France, and Thomas Paine's response, Rights of Man, in February 1791. Theobald Wolfe Tone wrote later that, "This controversy, and the gigantic event which gave rise to it, changed in an instant the politics of Ireland." Paine himself was aware of this commenting on sales of Part I of Rights of Man in November 1791, only eight months after publication of the first edition, he informed a friend that in England "almost sixteen thousand has gone off – and in Ireland above forty thousand". Paine may have been inclined to talk up sales of his works but what is striking in this context is that Paine believed that Irish sales were so far ahead of English ones before Part II had appeared. On 5 June 1792, Thomas Paine, author of the Rights of Man was proposed for honorary membership of the Dublin Society of the United Irishmen.

The fall of the Bastille was to be celebrated in Belfast on 14 July 1791 by a Volunteer meeting. At the request of Thomas Russell, Tone drafted suitable resolutions for the occasion, including one favouring the inclusion of Catholics in any reforms. In a covering letter to Russell, Tone wrote, "I have not said one word that looks like a wish for separation, though I give it to you and your friends as my most decided opinion that such an event would be a regeneration of their country". By 1795, Tone's republicanism and that of the society had openly crystallized when he tells us: "I remember particularly two days thae we passed on Cave Hill. On the first Russell, Neilson, Simms, McCracken and one or two more of us, on the summit of McArt's fort, took a solemn obligation...never to desist in our efforts until we had subverted the authority of England over our country and asserted her independence."

The culmination was an uprising against British rule in Ireland lasting from May to September 1798 – the Irish Rebellion of 1798 – with military support from revolutionary France in August and again October 1798. After the failure of the rising of 1798 the United Irishman, John Daly Burk, an émigré in the United States in his The History of the Late War in Ireland written in 1799, was most emphatic in its identification of the Irish, French and American causes.

== See also ==
- Civic virtue
- Classical liberalism
- Classicism
- Communitarianism
- Libertarian conservatism
- Quarrel of the Ancients and the Moderns
- Political philosophy of Immanuel Kant
- Republicanism in the United States

People

- Adam Ferguson
- Algernon Sidney
- Andrew Fletcher
- James Harrington
