= Alan Gabbey =

American philosopher

- Born: 1938 (age 87–88)

Education
- Education: Queen's University of Belfast (BSc, PhD)

Philosophical work
- Era: 21st-century philosophy
- Region: Western philosophy
- Institutions: Barnard College
- Main interests: Early Modern Philosophy (Spinoza, Descartes, and Newton)

William Alan Gabbey (born 1938) is an American philosopher and Professor Emeritus of Philosophy at Barnard College. He is also Reader Emeritus in History and Philosophy of Science at Queen's University of Belfast and a membre effectif of the International Academy of the History of Science. Gabbey is known for his works on early modern philosophy.
