= Consequentialist justifications of the state =

Arguments in political philosophy

Consequentialist justifications of the state are philosophical arguments which contend that the state is justified by the good results it produces.

The justification of the state is the source of legitimate authority for the state or government. Typically, a justification of the state explains why the state should exist, and what a legitimate state should or should not be able to do. Consequentialist justifications of the state focus on the results that are achieved when certain institutions are put in place. They are based on consequentialist theories such as utilitarianism. Consequentialism is sometimes confused with utilitarianism, but utilitarianism is only one member of a broad family of consequentialist theories.

Consequentialist theories usually maintain that the rightness or wrongness of an action depends on whether the results of the action are desirable. They are frequently contrasted to deontological theories of morality, which typically hold that certain actions are either forbidden or wrong per se.

== Justifications of state ==
In law and political theory, a state or sovereign is an institution that legitimates a particular government. Sometimes arguments about legitimacy have a mystical side to them, as when kings claim divine right.

Different political philosophies have distinct opinions concerning the state as a domestic organization monopolizing force.

As an example, consequentialists might observe that the state builds bridges. They would ask whether those bridges would have been built in the absence of the state and whether those bridges are valued by those who use them. If the bridges would not have otherwise been built and they are valuable to those who use them, then the existence of the state is justified.

A philosopher who doubts or denies the legitimacy of the state might respond by questioning the ethical premise, saying for example that the workers who built that bridge were exploited by the government that ordered it built, and/or by the investors in the private contractors who profited. The philosopher might have a deontological theory of exploitation.

Alternatively, a skeptic might concede that the bridge is a good consequence but contend that even on consequentialist grounds the argument fails. He might argue that an even better bridge might have been built under anarchist conditions. This counter-argument raises the issue of opportunity cost and the whole issue becomes an exercise in economic reasoning.

== See also ==
- Consequentialism
- Justification for the state
- Rule according to higher law
- Sovereign state
