= Hans Baron =

German-American historian

Hans Baron (June 22, 1900 – November 26, 1988) was a German-American historian of political thought and literature. His main contribution to the historiography of the period was to introduce in 1928 the term civic humanism (denoting most if not all of the content of classical republicanism).

== Life and career ==
Born in Berlin to a Jewish family, Baron was a student of the liberal Protestant theologian Ernst Troeltsch. After Hitler's rise to power in 1933, he left Germany, first for Italy and England, then in 1938 for the United States. He became a naturalized U.S. citizen in 1945. He was employed as a librarian and served as Research Fellow and Bibliographer at the Newberry Library from 1949 to 1965 and was a Distinguished Research Fellow at Newberry until 1970, when he retired. He also held a teaching appointment at the University of Chicago for many years. He was elected a Fellow of the American Academy of Arts and Sciences in 1964.

His most important work, The Crisis of the Early Italian Renaissance (1955), theorized that a threatened invasion of the Florentine city-state by Giangaleazzo Visconti of Milan had a dramatic effect on their conception of the directionality of history. Previously believing that good necessarily prevailed, upon considering the thought-to-be impending doom of the Florentine republic at the hands of Milan, some Florentine thinkers began to think otherwise. Baron theorized that it was this shift in understanding that allowed later thinkers like Niccolò Machiavelli to construct his view that free states required a politically realistic outlook in order to survive.

== Works ==
- Calvin Staatsanschauung und das konfessionalle Zeitalter (Berlin; Munich: R. Oldenbourg, 1924).
- Leonardo Bruni Aretino. Humanistisch-philosophische Schriftten (Leipzig; Berlin: B.G. Teubner, 1928; 1969).
- The Crisis of the Early Italian Renaissance: civic humanism and republican liberty in an age of classicism and tyranny (Princeton: 1955; 1966).
- Humanistic and Political Literature in Florence and Venice at the beginning of the quattrocento; studies in criticism and chronology (Cambridge: Harvard Univ. Press, 1955; 1968).
- Fifteenth-century civilisation and the Renaissance in New Cambridge Modern History, vol. 1 The Renaissance, 1493–1520 (Cambridge Univ. Press, 1957)
- From Petrarch to Bruni; studies in humanistic and political literature (Chicago: 1968).
- Petrarch’s Secretum: its making and its meaning (Cambridge, Mass.: Medieval Academy of America, 1985).
- In Search of Florentine Civic Humanism : essays on the transition from medieval to modern thought, 2 vols. (Princeton: 1988).
