= Knud Haakonssen =

Historian of philosophy

Knud Haakonssen FBA FRSE FRHistS
- Born: 9 July 1947 (age 78); Denmark

Education
- Education: University of Copenhagen (MA, PhD); University of Edinburgh (PhD)

Philosophical work
- Region: Western philosophy
- School: History of political thought; Intellectual history; Moral philosophy
- Institutions: University of Sussex; University of St Andrews; Max Weber Center, University of Erfurt
- Main interests: Natural law; Moral philosophy; Political philosophy; Scottish Enlightenment
- Website: http://knudhaakonssen.com/

Knud Haakonssen FBA FRSE FRHistS (born 1947) is a Danish historian of moral and political thought. He has held positions in political science, philosophy and history in Australia, New Zealand, the USA, England, Scotland and Germany and is now emeritus Professor of Intellectual History at the University of St. Andrews and the University of Sussex. He was Director of the Sussex Centre for Intellectual History, 2005-2011, Co-Director of the St. Andrews Institute for Intellectual History, 2016-23, and he founded the Centre for Early-Modern Natural Law, Universität Erfurt, 2016-22. He is known for his work on early modern thought, natural law theory, Adam Smith and the Scottish Enlightenment.

He is a Fellow of the British Academy (FBA), of the Royal Society of Edinburgh (FRSE), of the Royal Danish Academy of Sciences and Letters, of the Academy of the Social Sciences in Australia, and of the Royal Historical Society. Haakonssen has held multiple residential fellowships (2001–02, 2010–11, Fall 2011) at the Swedish Collegium for Advanced Study in Uppsala, Sweden. He was honoured with a Festschrift: Philosophy, Rights and Natural Law. Essays in Honour of Knud Haakonssen, ed. Ian Hunter and Richard Whatmore. Edinburgh University Press, 2019.

== Books ==
=== Monographs ===
- The Science of a Legislator: The Natural Jurisprudence of David Hume and Adam Smith (Cambridge University Press, 1981). French,Japanese and Chinese trans.
- Natural Law and Moral Philosophy: From Grotius to the Scottish Enlightenment (Cambridge University Press, 1996). Chinese trans.
- Enlightenments and Religions. 14th C. Th. Dimaras Lecture (2009), Institute for Neohellenic Research, Athens 2010 [pamphlet].

=== Text editions ===
- Thomas Reid, Practical Ethics: Being Lectures and Papers on Natural Religion, Self-Government, Natural Jurisprudence, and the Law of Nations. Princeton UP, 1990. Rev. ed.: Thomas Reid on Practical Ethics, Edinburgh UP, 2007
- David Hume, Political Essays. Cambridge Texts in the History of Political Thought, Cambridge UP, 1994. Portuguese, Serbian, and Turkish trans.
- Adam Smith, The Theory of Moral Sentiments. Cambridge Texts in the History of Philosophy. Cambridge UP, 2001. Chinese and Japanese trans.
- (co-ed.) Thomas Reid, Essays on the Intellectual Powers of Man. Edinburgh UP, 2002.
- (co-ed.) Thomas Reid, Essays on the Active Powers of Man. Edinburgh UP, 2010.
- (co-ed.) Thomas Reid on Society and Politics. Papers and Lectures. Edinburgh UP, 2015.
- (co-ed.) Francis Hutcheson, A System of Moral Philosophy, Liberty Fund, 2025.
- Samuel Pufendorf, The Law of Nature and Nations, trans. Basil Kennett, 5th ed. (1749), Liberty Fund, forthcoming.
- (general ed.) The Edinburgh Edition of Thomas Reid, Edinburgh UP, 10 vols., 1995–2021.
- (general ed.) Natural Law and Enlightenment Classics, Liberty Press, 43 titles, 2002-.
- (general ed.) (with Frank Grunert, Laura Beck Varela), Early Modern Natural Law: Studies and Sources, Brill, 2019-
- (general ed.) (with Anna Plassart, Paul Wood), The Edinburgh Edition of Dugald Stewart, Edinburgh UP, forthcoming.

=== Edited volumes ===
- (ed.) Traditions of Liberalism. Essays on John Locke, Adam Smith and John Stuart Mill, CIS, Sydney, 1988.
- (co-ed.) A Culture of Rights: The Bill of Rights in Philosophy, Politics and Law – 1791 and 1991, Cambridge UP, 1991.
- (ed.) Enlightenment and Religion: Rational Dissent in Eighteenth-Century Britain. Ideas in Context, Cambridge UP, 1996.
- (ed.) Grotius, Pufendorf and the Natural Law Tradition, International Library of Critical Essays in the History of Philosophy, Dartmouth Publ. Co., 1998.
- (ed.) Adam Smith, International Library of Critical Essays in the History of Philosophy, Dartmouth Publ. Co., 1998.
- (ed.) The Cambridge History of Eighteenth-Century Philosophy, 2 vols, Cambridge UP, 2006. Chinese trans., forthcoming.
- (ed.) The Cambridge Companion to Adam Smith, Cambridge UP, 2006. Chinese trans., forthcoming.
- (co-ed.) Northern Antiquities and National Identities. Perceptions of Denmark and the North in the Eighteenth Century, Royal Danish Academy of Sciences and Letters, Copenhagen, 2008.
- (co-ed.), Dugald Stewart: His Development in Scottish and European Context, special issue of History of European Ideas, 2012.
- (co-ed.), David Hume, International Library of Essays in the History of Political Thought, Ashgate, 2013.
- (ed.) Modern International Thought. A symposium on David Armitage's Foundations of Modern International Thought, special issue of History of European Ideas, 40 (2014).
- (ed.) Language in Intellectual History: The Work of Hans Aarsleff, special issue of History of European Ideas, 42 (2016).
- (co-ed.) Ludvig Holberg (1684-1754). Learning and Literature in the Nordic Enlightenment, Routledge, 2017.
- (ed.) John Millar and His Circle, special issue of History of European Ideas 45 (2019).
- (ed. with Ian Hunter) Cambridge Companion to Pufendorf, Cambridge UP, 2023.
