= Bangalore Principles of Judicial Conduct =

Indian judiciary conduct

The Bangalore Principles of Judicial Conduct are standards for ethical conduct of judges.

The six core values are:

1. Independence
2. Impartiality
3. Integrity
4. Propriety
5. Equality
6. Competence and Diligence

The Bangalore Code of Judicial Conduct was drafted in 2001 for the Judicial Group on Strengthening Judicial Integrity and presented to the Round Table Meeting of Chief Justices in November 2002. Resolution 23 of the United Nations Social and Economic Council promotes implementation of the Bangalore Principles by the judiciaries of Member States.

== See also ==
- Judicial independence
- Rule of law
