= Liberal legalism =

Belief that politics should be constrained by legal constitutional boundaries

In politics and law, liberal legalism is a belief that politics should be constrained by legal constitutional boundaries. Liberal legalism has also been called legal constitutionalism, as found in United States and Germany, as opposed to political constitutionalism, which is more typical of Britain, by British constitutional scholar Adam Tomkins. He argues in his book Our Republican Constitution that the British system of governance, in which Parliament controls government ministers, provides a better check on executive power than a system like that of the United States, where courts and laws are used to check executive power.

Martin Loughlin argues that the aim of legal liberalism is to "confine politics to the straight-jacket of law". Tomkins argues that courts and constitutions are a poor check on executive or legislative authority since they must wait for court decisions to bubble up from lesser courts before they can act; since this process can take years, even decades, to happen, the court is usually slow to act. Tomkins prefers a parliamentary system like Britain's as being "more suitable and more effective" at restraining governments, and sees flaws in the American system of having courts check executive power. Opponents of liberal legalism often cite examples of executives ignoring or overcoming legal restrictions for political gain, such as presidents George W. Bush and Barack Obama disregarding the War Powers Resolution.

== See also ==
- Constitutionalism
- Constitutional economics
- Philosophy of law
- Political naturalism
- Rule according to higher law
