= Political views of John Milton =

Politics were an important part of John Milton's life. Milton enjoyed little wide-scale early success, either in prose or poetry, until the production of his later, controversial political works starting with The Tenure of Kings and Magistrates and Eikonoklastes.

== Political works ==
Although Milton was known early on for a poem that he wrote about Shakespeare and for his masque Comus, he was only a minor figure until he started writing in a pamphlet war. By 1654, Milton was involved in public controversies, thinking that he could help the English people by using his writings to promote his political beliefs.

His writing brought him into a position of power in the Commonwealth, Secretary for Foreign Tongues to the Council of State, and he served in that duty from 1649 until 1659. His controversial works, starting with The Tenure of Kings and Magistrates and Eikonoklastes, were able to appeal to a larger audience than many of Milton's previous works, and, in turn, they sold well even though the content of the works were not received positively.

=== Antiprelatical tracts ===
The antiprelatical tracts were written just after the Bishops' Wars of 1639 and 1640. Milton joined the antiprelatical factions opposing the policies of William Laud, Archbishop of Canterbury, and the policies of the Church of England. The antiprelatical factions fell into a pamphlet war with those supporting the Anglican church structure. Through his various arguments, Milton connects the structure of church government and government in general while relying on scripture to serve as an authority for his arguments.

=== Areopagitica ===
Areopagitica was published at the height of the English Civil War. Milton argued forcefully against the Licensing Order of 1643 and he relies on biblical and classical references to strengthen his argument. The main focus of the piece is to attack traditionalists and complacent people who are afraid of change and debate. In the piece, Milton suggests that Christians experience purification when they are tested by new ideas and not harmed by them. Ironically though, the book was banned in England not long after publication.

=== The Tenure of Kings and Magistrates ===
Milton wrote The Tenure of Kings and Magistrates as a justification to Parliament's execution of Charles I. The work was controversial but popular, and it went into many five editions during the 17th century.

In it, he becomes the first European to posit a republic is the only acceptable form of government, and the first to argue that monarchy is an unacceptable form of government. (Nelson, Eric "Talmudical Commonwealthsmen and the Rise of Republican Exclusivism, The Historical Journal, 50, 4 (2007), pp. 809–835)

=== Eikonoklastes ===
Milton was commissioned to write Eikonoklastes as a response to Charles I's Eikon Basilike (1649). Eikon Basilike was published just after Charles I execution, and the work portrayed Charles I as a martyr. In Eikonoklastes, Milton tried to systematically critique each point in Eikon Basilike Throughout the work Milton believed that Charles I's work created a false idol, and he wanted to destroy it with truth. He also claimed that all monarchs have the potential to be tyrants, no matter how benevolent they may appear.

=== Defensio pro Populo Anglicano ===
The Defensio pro Populo Anglicano was a tract commissioned by Parliament to respond to Claudius Salmasius's defence of Charles I.

=== Defensio Secunda ===
Milton was commissioned to write Defensio Secunda as a defence of the Parliamentary regime, controlled by Cromwell, who sought to win the support of a European audience. The work was also a response to attacks on Defensio pro Populo Anglicano by Salmasius. The work was one of the last times that Milton ever discussed Cromwell's character.

=== A Treatise of Civil Power ===
Milton wrote A Treatise of Civil Power to warn against claims of heresy and of attempts to limit free speech in regards to religious matters. He addresses the tract to Cromwell and Parliament to encourage them to prevent such disregards for personal liberty.

=== The Ready and Easy Way ===
The Ready and Easy Way was written by Milton during the final moments of the Commonwealth and sought to promote his views on the establishment and constitution of an English Republic. His opinion was ignored, and the English Restoration soon after took place, heralding a form of monarchical government opposite in tendency to what Milton desired.

=== Paradise Lost ===
Milton’s politics also revealed themselves in his fictional works. For instance, scholars have argued that Paradise Lost was informed in part by contemporaneous comic broadsides like The Life and Death of Mris. Rump. Such broadsides had a political agenda: in this case, persuading Presbyterians to assent to a restoration of the monarchy. As Christopher N. Warren has argued, “For a republican independent like Milton observing these gestures, it was vital to demonstrate that the Presbyterians could not trust the promises of safety implied by the royalist allegories.” Paradise Lost’s Sin and Death allegory speaks to this concern by forestalling “comic reconciliation,” urging the reader to recall England’s violent political past, rather than “forgetting or sanitizing” the past in the move towards reconciliation.

== Views ==
=== Government ===
Milton supported a republican form of government. In 1649, Milton wrote The Tenure of Kings and Magistrates expressing his support of a republican form of government. English republicanism grew during the English Civil War after the royalist forces were defeated at Worcester during September 1651. When the Rump Parliament was removed and Oliver Cromwell became the Protector in December 1653, Milton, and other republicans, believed that the Commonwealth was not following the proper governmental path. The republicans no longer felt obliged to criticise the Stuart monarchy after it had fallen. Instead, they tried to convince the new government, under Cromwell, to adopt republican principles.

Republicanism picked up greater momentum when a series of anti-Cromwell works were published in 1656. The English republican movement, however, was not united: the so-called "commonwealthmen" held to the idea that the dissolution of the Rump had been illegal. Although Milton believed in their abstract ideas, he produced some works that defended the existing form of government under the Protectorate. Even in The Tenure of Kings and Magistrates, Milton wrote that people needed to support "the present Parlament & Army". His republicanism was put aside to support the government, and, in Defensio Secunda, he praised Cromwell's rule. Once Cromwell died and the Commonwealth fell apart, Milton returned to his republican principles, and he published several works in opposition to a monarchical form of government.

=== Licensing ===
Milton attacks the concept of licensing and promotes the need for debate and discussion in his Areopagitica. He believed that the government should not censor works because the search for truth and understanding is an ongoing process and must be open. The search for truth, according to Milton, is a continual process, and an individual can never attain truth if the expression of some views is prohibited by licensing laws. Milton's involvement with the licensing controversy proved to be important, and his ideas influenced later discussions of truth and the freedom of printing.
