= Political naturalism =

Political ideology and legal system

Political naturalism is a political ideology and legal system positing that there is a natural law, just and obvious to all, which crosses ideologies, faiths, and personal thinking, and that naturally guaranties justice. It is first explicitly mentioned in Aristotle's Politics. It is inspired by sociological naturalism, and methodological naturalism's belief that the precision of natural sciences can be applied to social sciences, and hence to practical social activities like politics and law. It may be seen as a natural law-based version of legalism and constitutionalism, especially of prescriptive constitutionalism in the way it tries to make a constitution how it should justly be. It also bears relation with many constitutional monarchies, which believe in rule of the law and in certain things who are naturally correct like monarchy and monarchic institutions and traditions.

The roots of political naturalism may be found in positive visions of natural law (like John Locke's and Jean-Jacques Rousseau's, and even in the Founding Fathers of the United States. (Note: The United States Declaration of Independence (1776) stated: "We hold these Truths to be self-evident, that all Men are created equal, that they are endowed by their Creator with certain unalienable Rights, that among these are Life, Liberty, and the pursuit of Happiness.") The Catholic German Centre Party politician and diplomat Karl Friedrich von Savigny also thought so. (Note: Karl Friedrich von Savigny stated that "laws are not made but found", implying the existence of already existing natural laws.) Its main modern thinker is Abd El-Razzak El-Sanhuri, an Egyptian legal scholar and the creator of the Egyptian Civil Code. (Note: Article 1 of the Egyptian Civil Code (1949) stated that "in the absence of any applicable legislation, the judge shall decide according to the custom and failing the custom, according to the principles of Islamic Law. In the absence of these principles, the judge shall have recourse to natural law and the rules of equity.") Through the Egyptian Code, many other Arab constitutions, such as in monarchist and pre-dictatorships Iraq and Libya and modern Qatar, ended up including political naturalist laws, and Al-Sanhuri himself wrote the Syrian and Jordanian civil codes and the Kuwaiti commercial code.

== See also ==
- Antinaturalism (politics)
- Liberal legalism
