= Political philosophy of Immanuel Kant =

Overview of Immanuel Kant's political philosophy

The political philosophy of Immanuel Kant (1724–1804) favoured a classical republican approach. In Perpetual Peace: A Philosophical Sketch (1795), Kant listed several conditions that he thought necessary for ending wars and creating a lasting peace. They included a world of constitutional republics by establishment of political community. His classical republican theory was extended in Doctrine of Right (1797), the first part of Metaphysics of Morals. At the end of the 20th century Kant's political philosophy had been enjoying a remarkable renaissance in English-speaking countries with more major studies in a few years than had appeared in the preceding many decades.

== Overview ==
Kant's most significant contribution to political philosophy and the philosophy of law is the doctrine of Rechtsstaat. According to this doctrine, the power of the state is limited in order to protect citizens from the arbitrary exercise of authority. The Rechtsstaat is a concept in continental European legal thinking, originally borrowed from German jurisprudence, which can be translated as "the legal state" or "state of rights". It is a "constitutional state" in which the exercise of governmental power is constrained by the law, and is often tied to the Anglo-American concept of the rule of law. Kant's political philosophy has been described as liberal for its presumption of limits on the state based on the social contract as a regulative matter.

In a Rechtsstaat, the citizens share legally based civil liberties and they can use the courts. A country cannot be a liberal democracy without first being a Rechtsstaat. German writers usually place Immanuel Kant's theories at the beginning of their accounts of the movement toward the Rechtsstaat. The Rechtsstaat in the meaning of "constitutional state" was introduced in the latest works of Immanuel Kant after US and French constitutions were adopted in the late 18th century. Kant's approach is based on the supremacy of a country's written constitution. This supremacy must create guarantees for implementation of his central idea: a permanent peaceful life as a basic condition for the happiness of its people and their prosperity. Kant was basing his doctrine on none other but constitutionalism and constitutional government. Kant had thus formulated the main problem of constitutionalism, “The constitution of a state is eventually based on the morals of its citizens, which, in its turns, is based on the goodness of this constitution.” Kant's idea is the foundation for the constitutional theory of the twentieth century.

The Rechtsstaat concept is based on the ideas, discovered by Immanuel Kant, for example, in his Groundwork of the Metaphysic of Morals: "The task of establishing a universal and permanent peaceful life is not only a part of the theory of law within the framework of pure reason, but per se an absolute and ultimate goal. To achieve this goal, a state must become the community of a large number of people, living provided with legislative guarantees of their property rights secured by a common constitution. The supremacy of this constitution… must be derived a priori from the considerations for achievement of the absolute ideal in the most just and fair organization of people’s life under the aegis of public law." The concept of the Rechtsstaat appeared in the German context in Robert von Mohl's book Die deutsche Polizeiwissenschaft nach den Grundsätzen des Rechtsstaates ("German police science according to the principles of the constitutional state", 1832–1834), and was contrasted with the aristocratic police state.

Kant opposed "democracy" – which, in that era, meant direct democracy – believing that majority rule posed a threat to individual liberty. He stated, "…democracy is, properly speaking, necessarily a despotism, because it establishes an executive power in which "all" decide for or even against one who does not agree; that is, "all", who are not quite all, decide, and this is a contradiction of the general will with itself and with freedom." As most writers at the time he distinguished three forms of government: democracy, aristocracy, and monarchy with mixed government as the most ideal form of government.

A distinctive feature of Kant's political philosophy is his conviction that the university should be a model of creative conflict: the philosopher's role within the university should be to "police" the higher faculties (which in his day were theology, law and medicine), making sure their teaching conforms to the principles of reason; likewise, the goal of perpetual peace in society can be achieved only when the rulers consult with philosophers on a regular basis.

== See also ==
- Constitutionalism
- Roerich Pact
- Rule according to higher law
- Rule of law
- Universal History
