= Rule according to higher law =

Belief that universal principles of morality override unjust laws

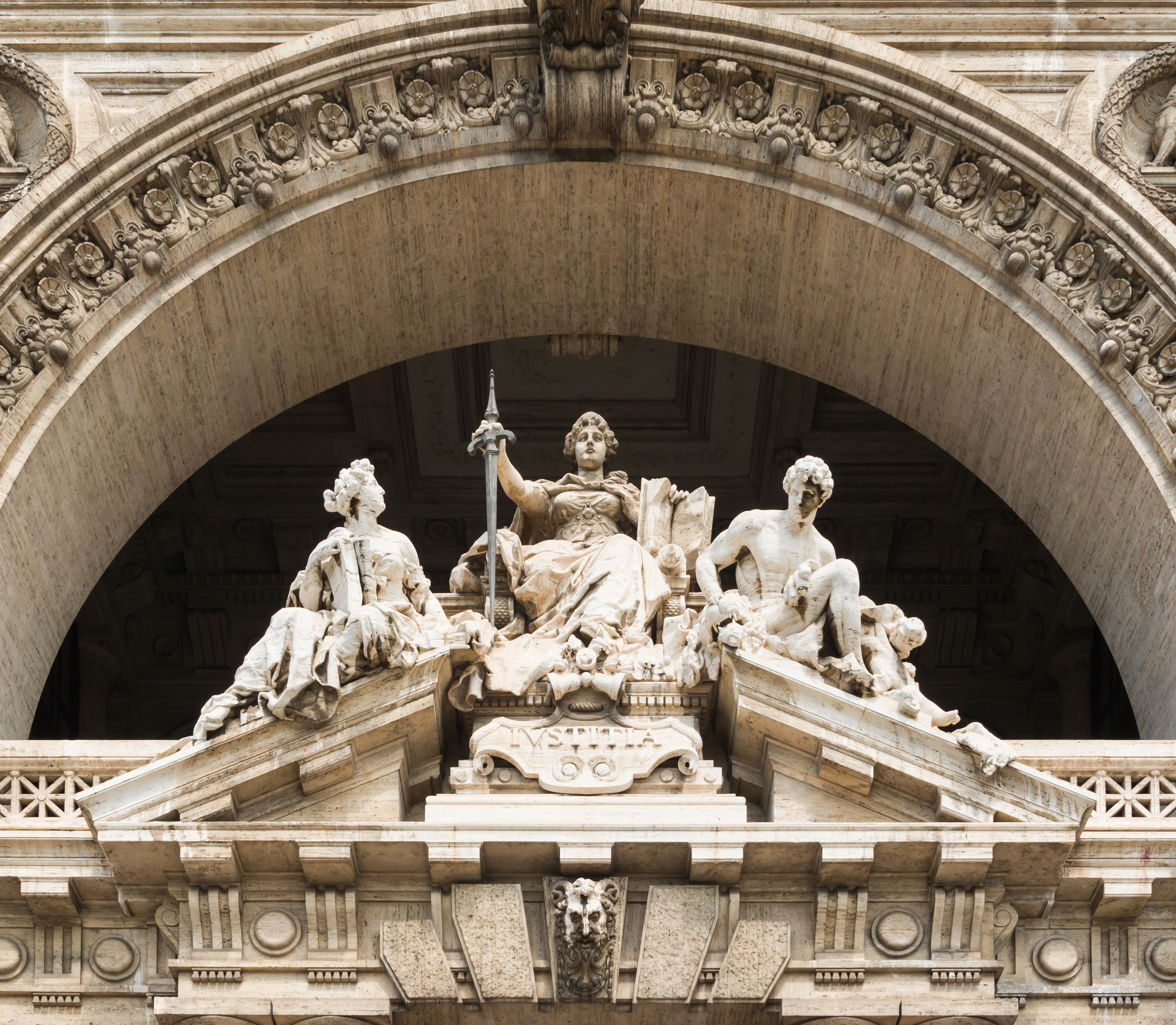
A statue of Iustitia, the personification of justice, at a courthouse in Rome

The rule according to a higher law is a philosophical concept that no law may be enforced by the government unless it conforms with certain universal principles (written or unwritten) of fairness, morality, and justice. Thus, the rule according to a higher law may serve as a practical legal criterion to qualify the instances of political or economical decision-making, when a government, even though acting in conformity with clearly defined and properly enacted law, still produces results which many observers find unfair or unjust.

== Doctrine ==
The idea of a law of ultimate justice over and above the momentary law of the state—a higher law—was first introduced into post-Roman Europe by the Catholic canon law jurists. "Higher law" can be interpreted in this context as the divine or natural law or basic legal values, established in the international law—the choice depending on the viewpoint; no matter the source, it is a law above the law. It is in this capacity that it possesses the equal legal value for both the common and civil law jurisdictions, as opposed to natural law which is largely associated with common law. "To recognize the necessary connection between the rule of law as an ideal and well-constructed constitutional government does not and should not be taken to imply that all states can or should maintain the same constitutional structures in practice".

The rule according to higher law is a practical approach to the implementation of the higher law theory that creates a bridge of mutual understanding (with regard to universal legal values) between the English-language doctrine of the rule of law, traditional for the countries of common law, and the originally German doctrine of Rechtsstaat, translated into other languages of continental Europe as état de droit (French), estado de derecho (Spanish), estado de direito (Portuguese), stato di diritto (Italian), and Правовое государство, pravovoe gosudarstvo (Russian). The latter doctrine is the product of continental European legal thought, which had adopted it from German legal philosophy. Amartya Sen mentioned that the legal theorists in ancient India used the classical Sanskrit term nyāya in the sense of not just a matter of judging institutions and rules, but of judging the societies themselves.

== Examples ==
Before the American Civil War, African Americans were legally denied equal rights and freedoms pursuant to formally valid codes prescribing the relations between master and slave. Although these codes were de jure fully suitable for application in legal practice, antislavery advocates argued that their enforcement by the US government de facto violated the basic human rights of a significant part of the population. In 1850, for example, during a Senate debate on the extension of slavery to new states and territories, William H. Seward famously proclaimed that slavery is forbidden under "a higher law than the Constitution".

In some countries, political leaders assert that the rule of law is purely a procedural concept. Therefore, they argue that any government may strip its subjects of their fundamental freedoms or infringe their vital interests so long as that is done by way of a duly-implemented legal mechanism. For example, at the Nuremberg trials, in an attempt to justify their crimes against Jewish and Romani population of Europe during World War II, some of the former leaders of Nazi Germany argued that they had broken none of the laws that were effective when Hitler had been in power. It was only by invoking the rule according to a higher law that the Allied prosecutors overcame such defenses.

In other countries, conversely, political leaders assert that all written laws must be kept in line with the universal principles of morality, fairness, and justice. These leaders argue that, as a necessary corollary to the axiom that "no one is above the law", the rule of law requires the government to treat all persons equally under the law. However, the proclaimed right to equal treatment is susceptible to instantly becoming void each time the government denies a sufficient level of respect, dignity, and autonomy to a certain class of individuals or to human rights in general.

== Rechtsstaat ==
The Rechtsstaat doctrine (legal state, state of right, constitutional state, constitutional government) was first introduced by the German philosopher Immanuel Kant in his latest works completed after the U.S. and French constitutions had been adopted in the late 18th century. Kant's approach is based on the supremacy of a country's written constitution, created using Higher Law principles. This supremacy meant creating guarantees for the implementation of his central idea: a permanently peaceful life as a basic condition for the happiness and prosperity of the citizens. Kant was basing his doctrine exclusively on the idea of constitutionalism and constitutional government.

The Russian legal system, born in the 19th century as a result of the transformations initiated by the reforms of the Emperor Alexander II, was (and still is) based primarily upon the German legal tradition. It was from the latter that Russia had adopted the doctrine of Rechtsstaat, which literally translates as "legal state". Its closest English analogue is "the rule of law". The Russian legal state concept adopts the written constitution as the country's supreme law (the rule of constitution). It is a fundamental but undefined principle that appears in the very first dispositive provision of Russia's post-communist constitution: "The Russian Federation – Russia – constitutes a democratic federative legal state with a republican form of governance." Similarly, the very first dispositive provision of Ukraine's constitution declares that "Ukraine is a sovereign and independent, democratic, social, legal state." Hence, the effort to invest meaning to the "legal state" definition is anything but theoretical.

Valery Zorkin, President of the Constitutional Court of Russia, wrote in 2003, "Becoming a legal state has long been our ultimate goal, and we have certainly made serious progress in this direction over the past several years. However, no one can say now that we have reached this destination. Such a legal state simply cannot exist without a lawful and just society. Here, as in no other sphere of our life, the state reflects the level of maturity reached by the society."

== By country ==
- Section 109 of the Constitution of Australia
- Primacy of European Union law
- Supremacy Clause (USA)
- Liberal democratic basic order (Germany)

== See also ==
- Constitutional economics
- Constitutional patriotism – Concept of citizenship
- Constitutional theory – Area of constitutional law
- Equality before the law – Judicial principle
- International human rights law – Body of international law designed to promote human rights
- International humanitarian law – law of war to protect non-combatants
- Judicial independence – Concept that the judiciary should be independent
- Jurisprudence – Theoretical study of law
- Kritarchy – Ancient Israelite system of rule by Biblical judges
- Legal doctrine – Set of rules or procedures through which judgements can be determined in a legal case
- Liberal legalism – Belief that politics should be constrained by legal constitutional boundaries
- Monism and dualism in international law
- Nuremberg principles – Guidelines for determining what constitutes a war crime
- Parliamentary sovereignty – Constitutional legal doctrine
- Political philosophy of Immanuel Kant – Overview of Immanuel Kant's political philosophy
- Religious democracy – Form of government
- Religious law – Ethical and moral codes taught by religious traditions
- Theocracy – Form of government with religious leaders
- Philosophy of law – branch of philosophy examining the nature of law
- Law
- Natural law
- Roerich Pact – International treaty for the protection of important cultural heritage

== Sources ==
- West's Encyclopedia of American Law (in 13 volumes), 2nd Ed., edited by Jeffrey Lehman and Shirelle Phelps. Publisher: Thomson Gale, 2004. ISBN 0-7876-6367-0.
- Kant’s Principles of Politics, including his essay on Perpetual Peace. A Contribution to Political Science, translation by W. Hastie, Edinburgh: Clark, 1891. In Perpetual Peace: A Philosophical Sketch
- Dicey, Albert. Introduction to the Study of the Law of the Constitution (8th Edition, Macmillan, 1915).
- Bingham, Thomas. "The Rule of Law", Centre for Public Law, Faculty of Law, University of Cambridge (2006-11-16).
- Edward S. Corwin, The "Higher Law" Background of American Constitutional Law (Ithaca, N.Y.: Cornell University Press, 1955)
- Buchanan, James M. (1987). "The Constitution of Economic Policy". The American Economic Review. 77 (3): 243–250. Bibcode:1987Sci...236.1433B. doi:10.1126/science.236.4807.1433. JSTOR 1804093. PMID 17793230.
- Wormser, René A., The Story of the LAW and the Men Who Made It—From the Earliest Times to the Present: Revised and Updated Edition of "The Law" (New York: Simon and Schuster, 1962).
- Buchanan, James M. (1 December 1990). "The domain of constitutional economics". Constitutional Political Economy. 1 (1): 1–18. doi:10.1007/BF02393031. S2CID 144307393.
- "Economics and the Rule of Law" The Economist (2008-03-13).
- Philip P. Wiener, ed., "Dictionary of the History of Ideas: Studies of Selected Pivotal Ideas", (David Fellman, "Constitutionalism"), vol 1, p. 485 (1973–74).
- Herman Belz, "A Living Constitution or Fundamental Law? American Constitutionalism in Historical Perspective" (Rowman & Littlefield Publishers, Inc. 1998), ISBN 978-0-8476-8643-8
- Louis Michael Seidman, "Critical Constitutionalism Now", 75 Fordham Law Review 575, 586 (Nov. 2006).
