= Margaret Fraser Tytler =

Scottish novelist

- Born: c. 1811; Scotland
- Died: December 15, 1850; Edinburgh
- Occupation: Writer
- Parents: William Fraser Tytler (father); Margaret Cussans Grant (mother)

Margaret Fraser Tytler (c. 1811 – December 15, 1850) was a Scottish writer, largely of works for children.

Margaret Fraser Tytler was born in Scotland, the daughter of William Fraser Tytler and Margaret Cussans Grant Tytler. Her father was the son of Alexander Fraser Tytler and the grandson of William Tytler and her aunt was the novelist Ann Fraser Tytler. In 1847, she married Thomas Ogilvy. Many of her works contain details and illustrations of her nephews Herbert, Upton, and especially George Rawdon Ruxton, children of her sister Christina.

Margaret Fraser Tytler died on 15 December 1850 in Edinburgh. Her final book was published over 20 years after her death.

== Bibliography ==
- Tales of the Great and Brave. 1 vol. London: Harvey and Darton, 1838.
- Tales of Many Lands. 1 vol. London: Harvey and Darton, 1839.
- Hymns and Sketches in Verse. London: Harvey and Darton, 1840.
- My Boy's First-Book. London: Harvey and Darton, 1840.
- My Boy's Second-Book. London: Harvey and Darton.
- The Deformed. Edinburgh, 1845.
- Tales of Good and Great Kings. Edinburgh, 1845.
- The Wonder Seeker; or, the History of Charles Douglas. London: Grant, 1846.
- The Wooden Walls of Old England. London, 1847.
- Little Fanny's Journal: or, My Own Child's Book. 1 vol. Edinburgh: W. P. Kennedy, 1851.
- Evan Lindsay. 1 vol. Edinburgh: W. P. Nimmo, 1874.
