= William Fraser Tytler =

Scottish lawyer and historian

William Fraser Tytler of Balnain FRSE (10 September 1777 – 4 September 1853) was a 19th-century Scottish lawyer and historian.

== Life ==
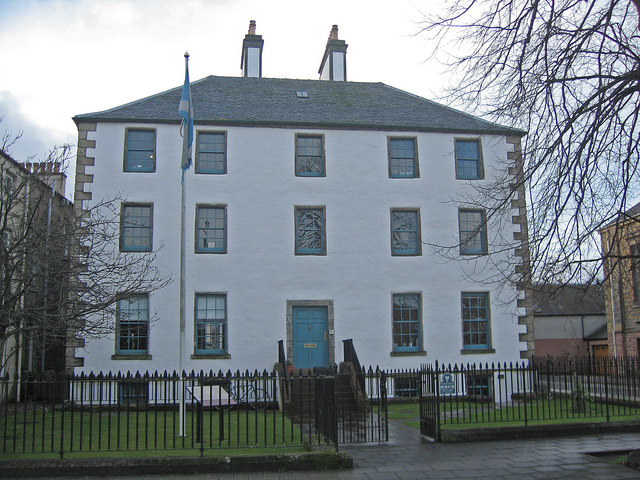
Balnain House, Inverness

He was born at Campbells Close on the Grassmarket in Edinburgh on 10 September 1777 the son of Anne Fraser of Balnain and Alexander Fraser Tytler. He was the grandson of William Tytler of Woodhouselee.

He trained as a lawyer and qualified as an advocate in 1799. He set up practice at 65 Princes Street in Edinburgh. In 1801 he succeeded his father as Professor of Constitutional and Universal History at the University of Edinburgh. He then moved to 7 South Castle Street.

He was elected a Fellow of the Royal Society of Edinburgh in 1807. His proposers were Thomas Charles Hope, Sir James Hall and John Playfair.

In 1810 he was appointed Sheriff of Inverness. This was possibly pre-empted by his inheriting his mother's family home: Balnain House near Inverness. However, he frequently returned to Edinburgh (to continue his professorial duties) staying with his mother at 108 Princes Street. He was heavily criticised for his lack of attendance at the University of Edinburgh and eventually relinquished his position in 1821. In Inverness he worshipped at St John's Episcopal Church.

In December 1846 Fraser Tytler alerted the authorities in Edinburgh to the famine developing in the Western Isles as a result of the loss of the potato crop to blight. This resulted in an investigation by the Army Commissariat and the dispatch of the gunboat Firefly to Barra with a relief supply of barley-meal. Eight men from Berneray sent for trial in Inverness for taking barrels of flour from the wreck of the cargo ship Superb which had run aground off the coast of North Uist were released by Fraser Tytler after being admonished, and returned home at his expense.

Fraser Tytler died at Great Malvern on 4 September 1853, aged 75.

== Family ==
In 1801 he married Margaret Cussans Grant, and together they had at least ten children. Their sons served in the Indian army or East India Company.

His daughter Jane Anne Fraser Tytler was married to Field Marshal Sir Patrick Grant, and had two sons: Alexander Charles Grant and Aldourie Patrick Grant.

His brothers were James Fraser Tytler and Patrick Fraser Tytler.

== Publications ==
- A Universal History (1850)
