= James Fraser Tytler =

Scottish lawyer

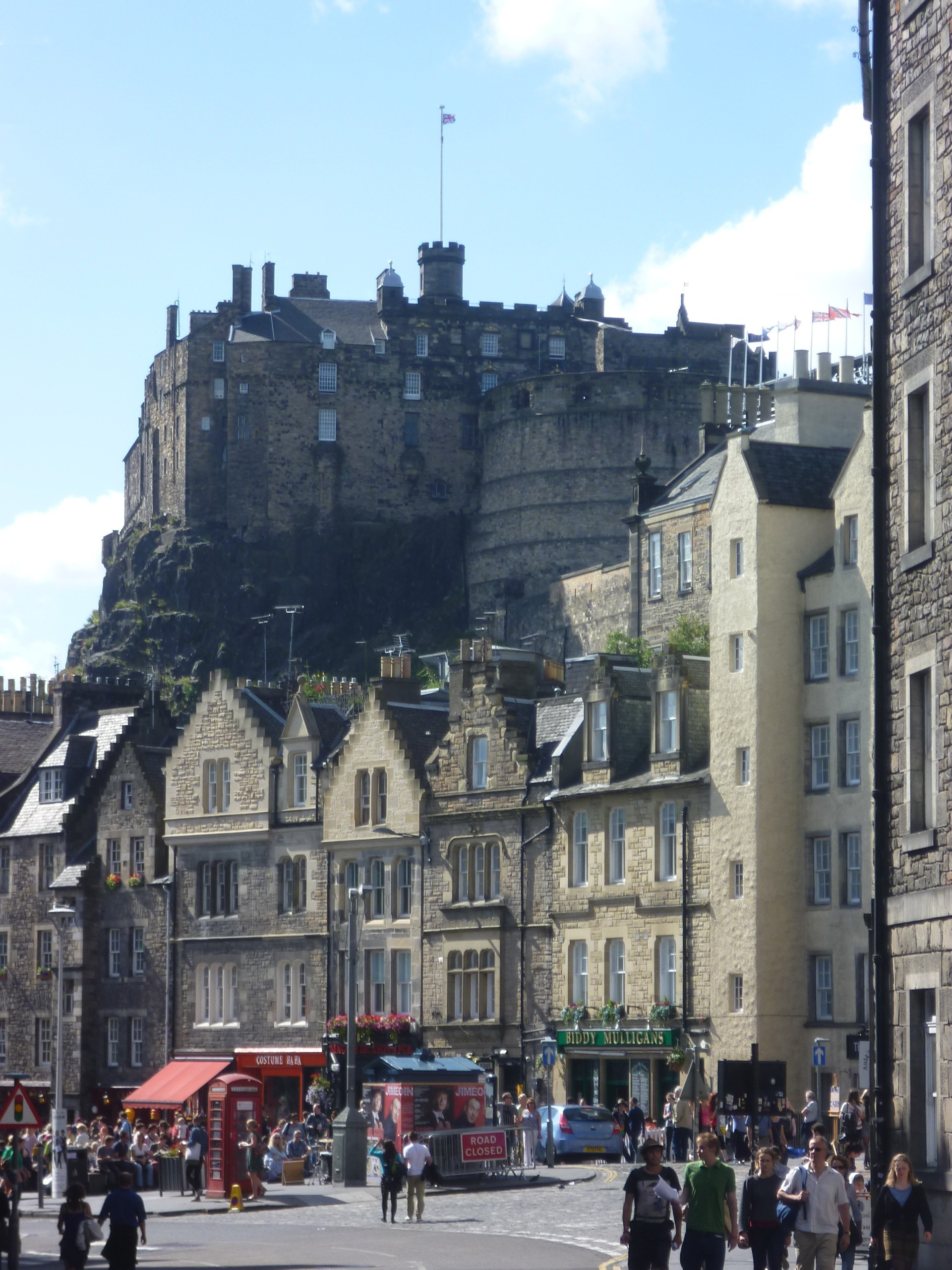
The Grassmarket, with Edinburgh Castle above

James Fraser Tytler of Woodhouselee WS FRSE (1780–1862) was a 19th-century Scottish lawyer and Depute to the Lord Lyon, dealing with heraldic matters.

== Life ==
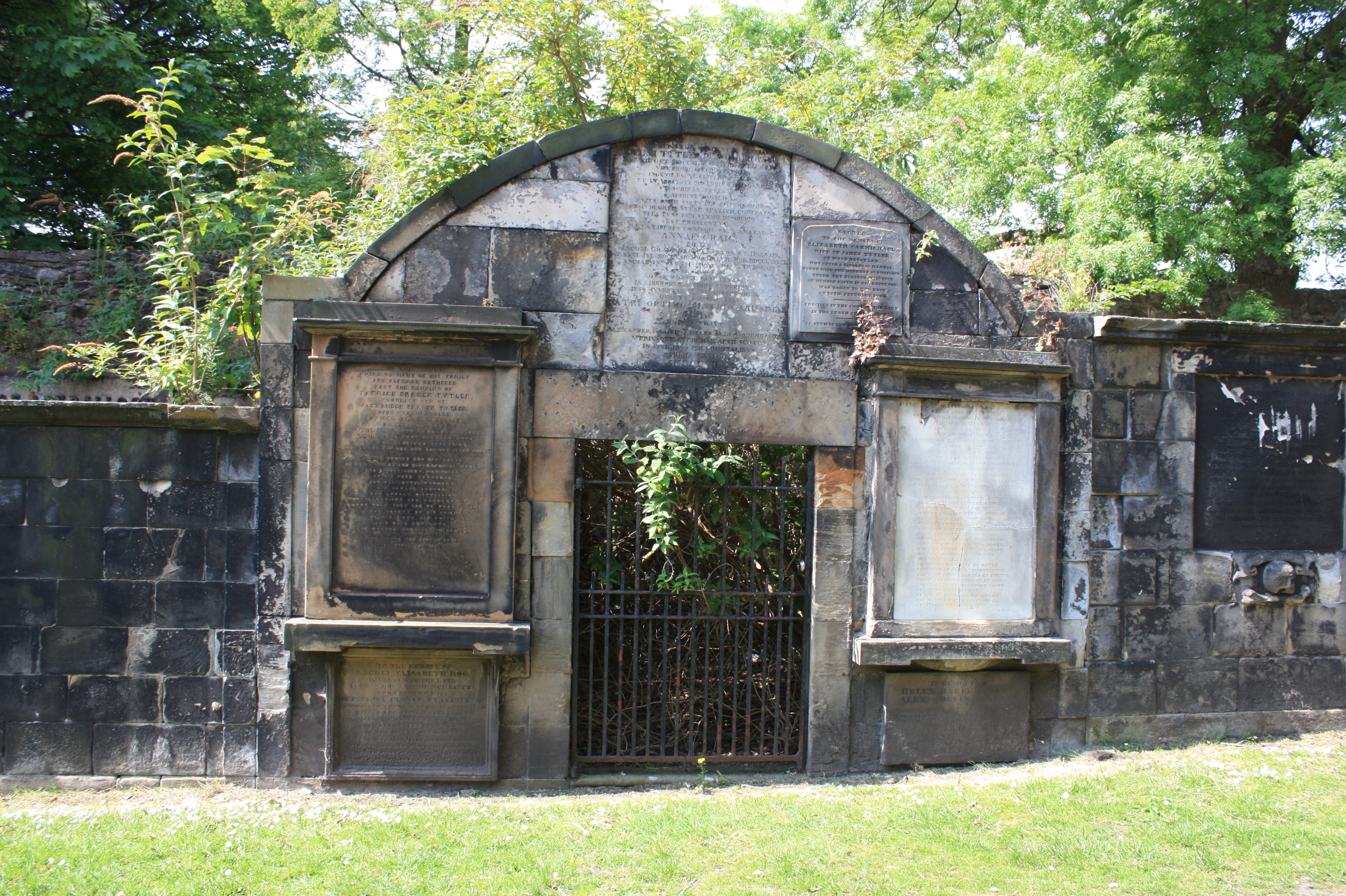
The Fraser Tytler family vault, Greyfriars Kirkyard

He was born in or near Edinburgh on 9 October 1780, the son of the eminent judge, Alexander Fraser Tytler, Lord Woodhouselee, and his wife, Ann Fraser of Balnain, and paternal grandson of William Tytler.

In 1794 he was apprenticed as a lawyer to Richard Hotchkiss WS in offices on the south side of the Grassmarket in Edinburgh, under the shadow of Edinburgh Castle. He qualified as a Writer to the Signet in 1803 and set up practice in the New Town at 9 Duke Street (later renamed Dublin Street).

He was elected a Fellow of the Royal Society of Edinburgh in 1821. His proposer was William Arbuthnot. At this stage he acted as legal advisor to the Scottish Tax Office at 12 North St David Street and lived at 34 Charlotte Square, one of Edinburgh's most exclusive addresses.

In 1827 he became Depute and legal advisor to the Lord Lyon and in 1829 he became Crown Agent and principal legal advisor to the Lord Advocate.

In later life he shared legal chambers with his son at 19 Castle Street.

He died on the day following his 82nd birthday, on 10 October 1862. He is buried on the family estate at Woodhouselee near Roslin, Midlothian. The house is now demolished. He is also memorialised on the family vault in Greyfriars Kirkyard, but the vault lies within the section known as the Covenanters Prison which is generally closed to the public.

== Family ==
In 1810 he married Elizabeth Carmichael (d.1845). They were parents to James Stuart Fraser Tytler WS.

He was brother of Patrick Fraser Tytler.

His uncle was Col Patrick Tytler.
