= Patrick Tytler (British Army officer) =

Scottish soldier (1760–1849)

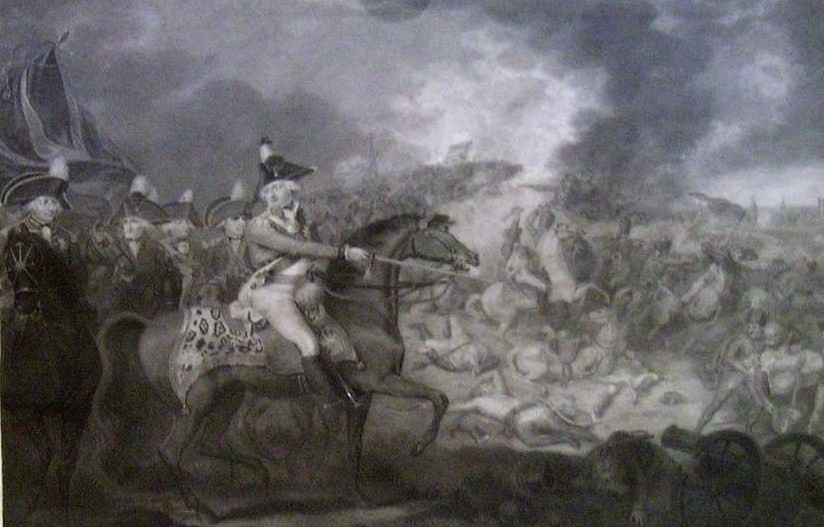
The Battle of Famars

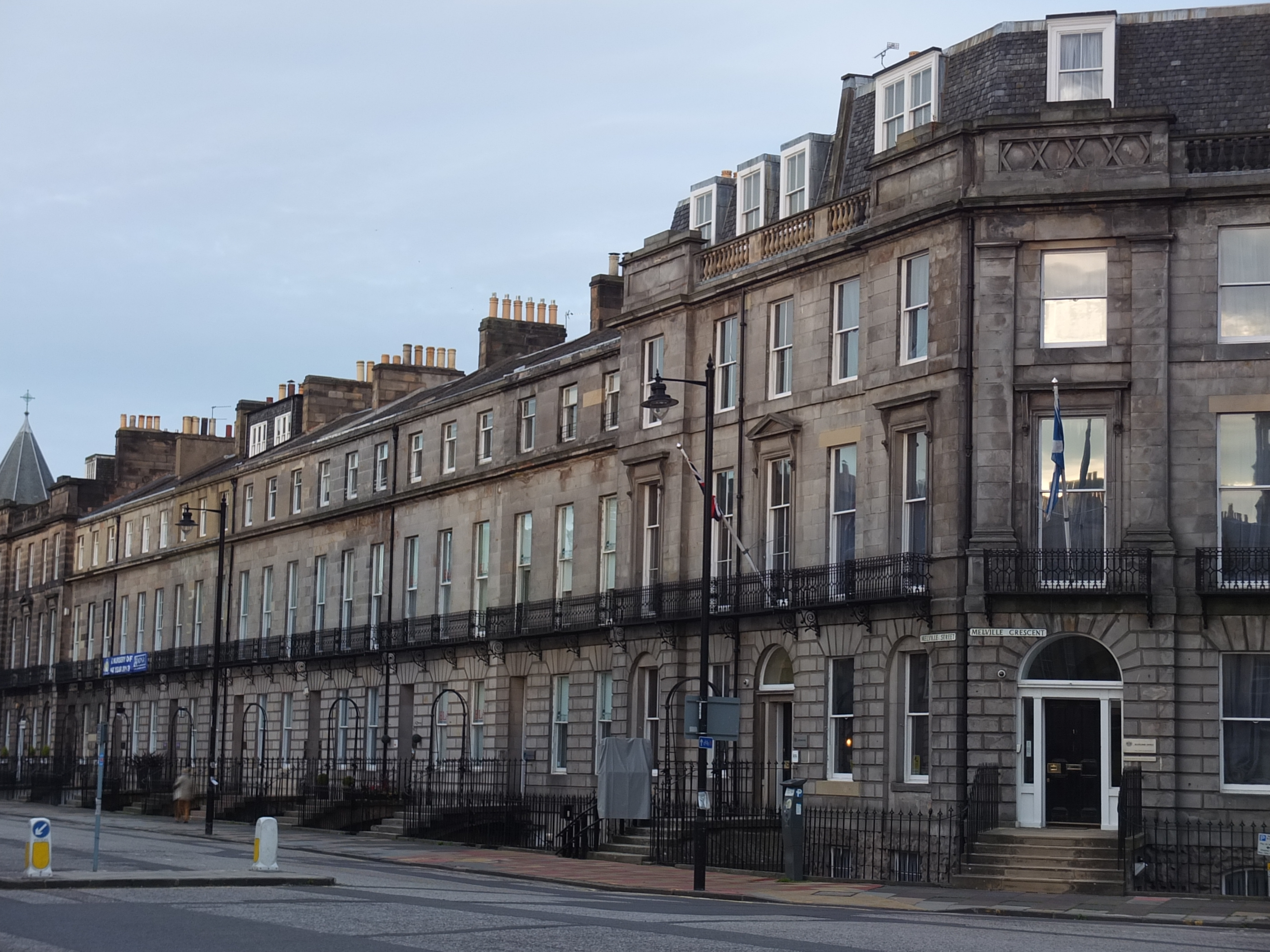
Melville Street, Edinburgh

Lieutenant-colonel Patrick Duff Tytler FRSE (1760–1849) was an 18th-century Scottish soldier who oversaw Stirling Castle.

== Life ==
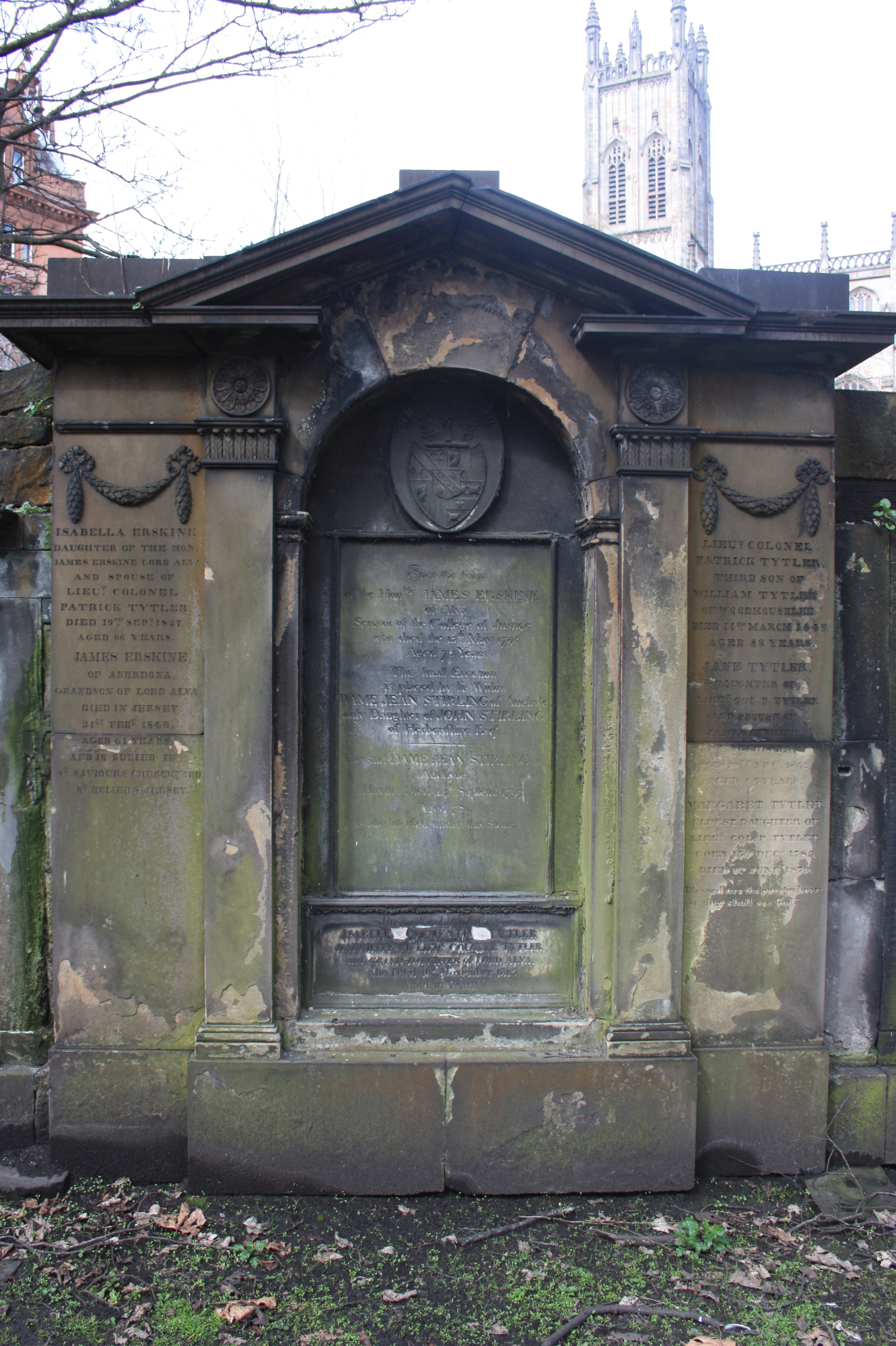
The grave of James Erskine, Lord Alva, St Cuthbert's Churchyard, Edinburgh

He was born in the spring of 1760 in or near Edinburgh the son of William Tytler and his wife, Anne Craig of Costerton.

Trained as a career soldier, he joined as an ensign in the 57th Regiment of Foot and was dispatched to fight in the American War of Independence in 1776 under Lord Cornwallis. He was stationed on Long Island under Sir William Howe. He saw action at the Battle of Brooklyn in August 1776. He purchased a lieutenancy and led troops in the Battle of Monmouth Courthouse against Washington in June 1778. His battalion was then placed under overall command of Sir Charles Grey and attacked the village of Topan. During this attack he personally captured Washington's aide-de-camp Captain Randolph. Randolph was later released, and Tytler later encountered him when he, himself, was captured. This led to him having breakfast with George Washington, whom he greatly admired. He also took part in the Battle of Jamestown and at Fort Montgomery.

After the peace of 1782 he transferred to the 56th Regiment at the rank of major. In 1793 he became aide-de-camp to Sir Ralph Abercrombie and fought with him in the Netherlands campaign. In Flanders he fought in the Battle of Cambray and Battle of Famars in May 1793. He was soon after promoted to colonel in Lord Elgin's Fencibles.

He was fort major of Stirling Castle during the Napoleonic Wars until around 1805. In the early 19th century, he became assistant quartermaster general for Scotland and relocated to Edinburgh. Although his official duties were at Edinburgh Castle, he lived off-site with his family, firstly at 3 Charlotte Street (off Princes Street), then at 11 Melville Street in Edinburgh's West End.

He was elected a Fellow of the Royal Society of Edinburgh in 1814 and resigned in 1836. He was still living at 11 Melville Street.

He died at his son-in-law's estate, Ardona in Clackmannanshire (near Alva) on 14 March 1849 aged 89. He is buried in the grave of his father-in-law, Lord Alva, in St Cuthbert's churchyard at the west end of Princes Street in Edinburgh.

His will is held by the National Archive in Kew.

== Family ==
He was married to Isabella Erskine, daughter of James Erskine, Lord Alva (one of his father's legal colleagues). Their children included Anne, William and Elizabeth Glencairn Tytler. The latter married Sir Archibald Alison, 1st Baronet. Anne married Berkeley Buckingham Stafford (1797–1847) (High Sheriff of Louth in 1828), the father of Sir Edward Stafford (1819–1901), who served three terms as the Prime Minister of New Zealand.

He was younger brother to Alexander Fraser Tytler, Lord Woodhouselee and uncle to his sons, Patrick Fraser Tytler and James Fraser Tytler.
