= Mob rule =

Democracy spoiled by demagoguery and the rule of passion over reason

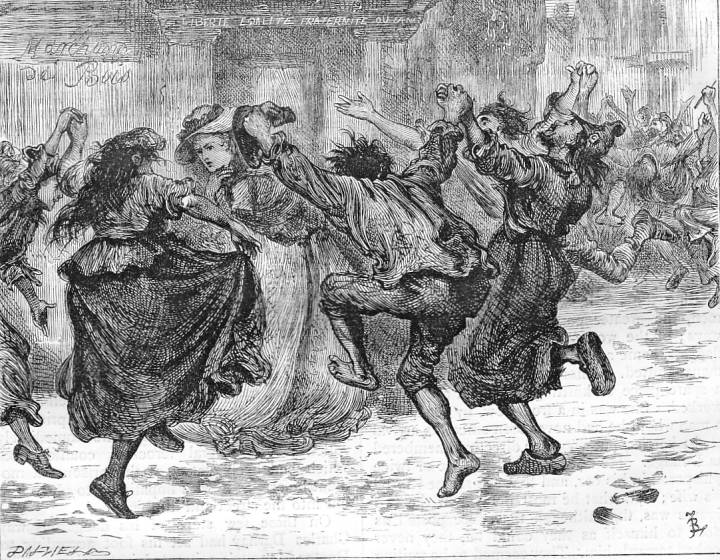
A Tale of Two Cities, the mob in Paris dancing La Carmagnole, by Fred Barnard

Mob rule or ochlocracy or mobocracy is a pejorative term describing an oppressive majoritarian form of government controlled by the common people through the intimidation of authorities. Ochlocracy is distinguished from democracy or similarly legitimate and representative governments by the absence or impairment of a procedurally civil process reflective of the entire polity.

== Names ==
Ochlocracy comes from Latin ochlocratia, from Greek ὀχλοκρατία (okhlokratía), from ὄχλος (ókhlos, "mass", "mob", or "common people") and κράτος (krátos, "rule"). An ochlocrat is one who is an advocate or partisan of ochlocracy. The adjective may be either ochlocratic or ochlocratical.

Ochlocracy is synonymous in meaning and usage to mob rule or mobocracy, which was coined in the 18th century from the sense of "mob" meaning the common rabble that arose from the Latin phrase mobile vulgus ("the fickle crowd") in the 1680s during disputes over the United Kingdom's Glorious Revolution.

== Origin ==
Polybius appears to have coined the term ochlocracy in his 2nd century BC work Histories (6.4.6). He uses it to name the "pathological" version of popular rule, in opposition to the good version, which he refers to as democracy. There are numerous mentions of the word "ochlos" in the Talmud, in which "ochlos" refers to anything from "mob", "populace", to "armed guard", as well as in the writings of Rashi, a Jewish commentator on the Bible. The word was first recorded in English in 1584, derived from the French ochlocratie (1568), which stems from the original Greek okhlokratia, from okhlos ("mob") and kratos ("rule", "power", or "strength").

Ancient Greek political thinkers regarded ochlocracy as one of the three "bad" forms of government (tyranny, oligarchy, and ochlocracy) as opposed to the three "good" forms of government: monarchy, aristocracy, and "polity". They distinguished "good" and "bad" according to whether the government form would act in the interest of the whole community ("good") or in the exclusive interests of a group or individual at the expense of justice ("bad").

Polybius' predecessor, Aristotle, distinguished between different forms of democracy, stating that those disregarding the rule of law devolved into ochlocracy. Aristotle's teacher, Plato, considered democracy itself to be a degraded form of government and the term is absent from his work.

The threat of "mob rule" to a democracy is restrained by ensuring that the rule of law protects minorities or individuals against short-term demagoguery or moral panic. However, considering how laws in a democracy are established or repealed by the majority, the protection of minorities by rule of law is questionable. Some authors, like the Bosnian political theoretician Jasmin Hasanović, connect the emergence of ochlocracy in democratic societies with the decadence of democracy in neo-liberal Western societies, in which "the democratic role of the people has been reduced mainly to the electoral process".

== History ==
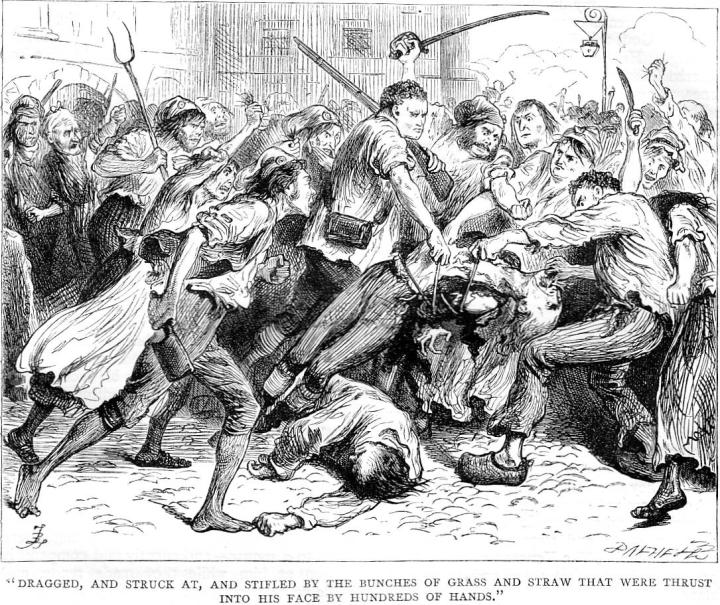
The mob attacking Joseph Foullon de Doué

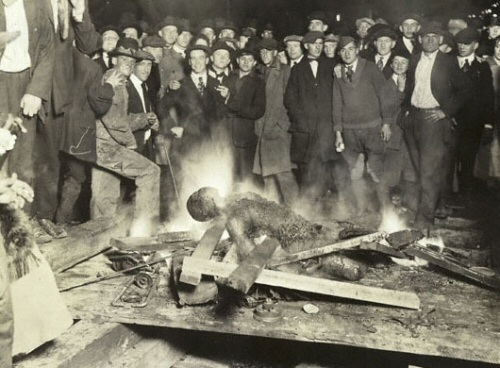
African-American lynched by white mob in Omaha, Nebraska, September 28, 1919, during the "Red Summer"

During the late 17th and the early 18th centuries, English life was very disorderly. Although the Duke of Monmouth's rising of 1685 was the last rebellion, there was scarcely a year in which London or the provincial towns did not see aggrieved people breaking out into riots. According to the historian George Clark, "In Queen Anne's reign [1702–1714] the word 'mob', first heard of not long before, came into general use." With no police force, there was little public order. Several decades later, the anti-Catholic Gordon Riots swept through London and claimed hundreds of lives; at the time, a proclamation painted on the wall of Newgate prison announced that the inmates had been freed by the authority of "His Majesty, King Mob".

The Salem Witch Trials in colonial Massachusetts during the 1690s, in which the unified belief of the townspeople overpowered the logic of the law, also has been cited by one essayist as an example of mob rule.

In 1837, Abraham Lincoln wrote about lynching and "the increasing disregard for law which pervades the country – the growing disposition to substitute the wild and furious passions in lieu of the sober judgment of courts, and the worse than savage mobs for the executive ministers of justice."

Mob violence played a prominent role in the early history of the Latter Day Saint movement. Examples include the expulsions from Missouri, the Haun's Mill massacre, the death of Joseph Smith, the expulsion from Nauvoo, the Mountain Meadows Massacre, the murder of Joseph Standing, and the Cane Creek Massacre. In an 1857 speech, Brigham Young gave an address demanding military action against "mobocrats".

== See also ==
- Anacyclosis
- Anarchism
- Argumentum ad populum
- Bandwagon effect
- Cancel culture
- Collective consciousness
- Collective effervescence
- Collective intelligence
- Collectivism and individualism
- Communal violence
- Consensus reality
- Criticism of democracy
- Crowd manipulation
- Crowd psychology
- Democratic backsliding
- Diffusion of responsibility
- Direct democracy
- Group dynamics
- Herd behavior
- Illiberal democracy
- Lynching
- Mass psychogenic illness
- Mobbing
- Peer pressure
- Political demonstration
- Populism
- Presumption of guilt
- Proletarian revolution
- Smart mob
- Social group
- Spiral of silence
- Tyranny of the majority
- Vigilantism
- Vox populi
