= Qualified democracy =

Democratic model with civic–ethical qualification for public office

Qualified democracy is a proposed model of democratic governance that preserves universal suffrage and free, competitive elections while introducing prior civic–ethical qualification requirements for those who seek to exercise political power. Rather than replacing democracy, it is presented as an attempt to strengthen it by treating political leadership as a professional activity, subject to standards of competence, integrity and accountability comparable to those expected in highly regulated fields such as medicine or law.

In this perspective, political office is not understood as an unregulated extension of the right to vote, but as a function that carries significant risks and responsibilities for the wider population. Advocates of qualified democracy argue that contemporary democratic systems often allow individuals with no demonstrable ethical reliability or civic competence to access positions of great power, which can facilitate corruption, populist manipulation and institutional degradation.

A formulation of qualified democracy discussed in recent literature is the concept of aretecracy, developed by legal scholar Milton Arrieta-López. In his work, aretecracy is defined as a democratic framework that introduces civic–ethical licensing and continuous evaluation for holders of public office, while maintaining universal elections. A later concept note explicitly describes aretecracy as a form of qualified democracy, using the expression "aretecracy as qualified democracy" in the title itself.

Although no contemporary state has fully adopted this model, the notion of qualified democracy and its aretecratic variant has been discussed in academic publications and cited in institutional documents, particularly in debates on democratic quality, political ethics and institutional reform.

== Concept and definition ==
Qualified democracy refers to a family of proposals that seek to combine the core elements of modern democracy—universal suffrage, competitive elections, pluralism and protection of fundamental rights—with additional mechanisms designed to ensure that only candidates who meet certain civic and ethical standards can hold public office.

Under a qualified democratic framework, the right to vote remains universal and equal. What is qualified is the exercise of public power: candidates must satisfy pre-defined criteria before being allowed to stand for election, and may be subject to ongoing supervision or renewal of their credentials. These criteria tend to focus on:

- basic constitutional and legal competence;
- an ethical record compatible with the responsibilities of office;
- independence from conflicting private interests;
- and a demonstrable commitment to democratic and human-rights norms.

Advocates argue that such mechanisms aim to protect citizens from the collective harm that can result when highly consequential political decisions are taken by actors who lack minimum civic reliability. Rather than being a technocratic or anti-democratic project, qualified democracy is presented as an attempt to align the authority to govern with higher standards of responsibility and accountability.

== Origins and theoretical background ==
=== Conceptual antecedents ===
The idea that political power should be exercised by individuals who demonstrate some form of excellence or virtue has deep historical roots. Classical political philosophy associated good government with the moral and intellectual qualities of rulers, and many constitutional traditions have long established basic eligibility criteria for public office (such as age, citizenship or absence of serious criminal convictions).

Modern debates about democratic quality have also explored the tension between strictly egalitarian conceptions of political participation and concerns about competence, information and responsibility in decision-making. Discussions on the "tyranny of the majority", populism, plutocracy and the capture of institutions by private interests have highlighted structural vulnerabilities in contemporary democracies.

Qualified democracy situates itself within this wider tradition by proposing that, beyond formal rights and procedures, democratic systems should incorporate institutional devices that ensure a minimum level of civic–ethical fitness for those who seek to govern.

=== Contemporary formulation ===
The contemporary formulation of qualified democracy has been developed in detail in a body of work that introduces and elaborates the concept of aretecracy. In a series of articles, Arrieta-López defines aretecracy (from the Greek aretḗ, "virtue" or "excellence", and krátos, "power" or "rule") as a system of "qualified government" designed to counter deformations of democracy such as corruption, clientelism and the concentration of political power in unqualified elites.

Later writings refine this framework by explicitly describing aretecracy as a form of qualified democracy that preserves universal suffrage while introducing pre-candidacy civic–ethical qualification and institutional oversight. These texts situate the proposal in the context of broader debates on populism and plutocracy, arguing that democratic legitimacy requires not only free elections but also independent mechanisms to prevent unfit candidates from accessing positions of great power.

Subsequent academic works have cited or engaged with this model in discussions on democratic ethics, citizenship, human rights and institutional reform, treating qualified democracy and aretecracy as examples of virtue-oriented democratic theories.

== Scholarly reception and usage ==
The notion of qualified democracy, particularly in its aretecratic formulation, has been discussed in peer-reviewed literature dealing with democratic theory, human rights and governance. Arrieta-López's three main articles on aretecracy elaborate the theoretical foundations of qualified democracy, its ethical framework and its relation to successive generations of human rights.

Iriarte-Angarita analyses aretecracy or "virtuscracia" as a teleological objective for civil society in the twenty-first century, situating it among other proposals that seek to strengthen the ethical dimension of democratic governance.

The concept has also been mentioned or applied in a range of studies on citizen normative management, participatory democracy, majority rule, contractual planning, democracy in the context of artificial intelligence and the Internet of Things, administrative law, education and democratic practices, and judicial control. These include works by Hernández de Velazco et al., Troncozo Montes, Fontana Filho, Castillo Povea, Moreno, Zambrano Sánchez, Vilca Vilca, Guerra Pérez, Arynova and De León Vertel.

In these works, the concept is often cited as part of broader reflections on democratic quality, institutional responsibility and the relationship between politics, law and social ethics. Qualified democracy and aretecracy are typically treated as theoretical tools rather than as directly applicable institutional blueprints.

== Institutional references ==
Although qualified democracy and aretecracy have not been formally adopted by any state, the concepts have been cited in institutional and policy-related documents, which indicates some circulation beyond strictly academic settings.

In 2020, a non-governmental organization with consultative status before the United Nations Economic and Social Council (ECOSOC) referenced aretecracy in a written statement submitted during the High-Level Segment on the Sustainable Development Goals. The concept was mentioned in the context of reflections on democratic quality, ethical governance and institutional responsibility.

In 2021, the term appeared in a report of the Constitution and Regulations Committee of the Congress of the Republic of Peru, in discussions on proposed amendments to the Organic Law of the Executive Branch. In that document, aretecracy was cited in relation to debates about ethical and managerial requirements for ministers of state and proposals to strengthen public accountability.

In 2023, the concept was also used in an institutional publication of the Colombian Senate's research body, the Centro de Investigaciones y Altos Estudios Legislativos (CAEL). There, aretecracy was referenced within a wider juridico-political analysis of democracy, education and the risks of plutocracy and ochlocracy in Latin America.

These references do not amount to official adoption of qualified democracy as a constitutional model, but they illustrate the presence of the concept in institutional discourse on democratic reform and governance.

== Institutional design ==
In theoretical models of qualified democracy, institutional design plays a central role. Rather than proposing a single uniform structure, these models describe a set of principles and mechanisms that can be implemented in different ways according to each constitutional context.

The qualification stage is conceived as a procedural safeguard, not as a closed technocratic filter. Its purpose is to ensure that individuals who seek public office meet minimum standards of civic responsibility, ethical conduct and constitutional understanding before appearing on the ballot.

Proposals for institutional design typically include:

- a prior civic–ethical qualification process before candidacy;
- independent supervisory and oversight bodies, which may be centralized or decentralized;
- publicly accessible criteria and transparent procedures;
- mechanisms for review, appeal and external auditing;
- and clear sanctions for ethical breaches, corruption or abuse of power, including suspension or revocation of credentials.

One important feature of these models is that authorization to exercise political power is treated as conditional and ongoing, rather than as a one-time certification. Qualification may take the form of renewable licenses, subject to periodic evaluation. Where serious misconduct is demonstrated through due process, qualified-democracy frameworks envisage institutional mechanisms to revoke the license to hold office, without suppressing democratic elections themselves.

The ethical foundations of this design are often articulated around three interrelated principles: freedom, equality and solidarity, understood in connection with civil and political rights, economic, social and cultural rights, and collective or third-generation rights related to peace, development and the environment. In this sense, qualified democracy seeks to integrate the evolution of human-rights law into the standards that govern political leadership.

== Aretecracy ==
=== Conceptual clarification ===
Aretecracy is a specific formulation of qualified democracy developed in contemporary legal and political theory. The term combines the Greek words for "virtue" or "excellence" (aretḗ) and "power" or "rule" (krátos), and is used to denote a democratic system in which candidates for public office must obtain a civic–ethical qualification prior to standing in universal elections.

In Arrieta-López's work, aretecracy is presented as a "qualified system of government" designed to counter deformations of democracy such as corruption, plutocracy and demagogic manipulation. It preserves the principle of popular sovereignty but seeks to ensure that those who exercise it on behalf of citizens meet enforceable ethical and civic standards.

Over time, the author has described aretecracy explicitly as a form of qualified democracy, emphasizing its compatibility with human-rights frameworks and its focus on democratic quality rather than on limiting participation.

== Criticism and debates ==
=== Elitism ===
One of the main criticisms directed at qualified-democracy models is the risk of elitism. Critics argue that introducing prior qualification for political office could favour individuals with greater access to education, institutional resources or cultural capital, thereby reinforcing existing social hierarchies. From this perspective, the creation of specialized bodies to certify candidates might shift political power away from ordinary citizens towards professionalized elites.

Proponents respond that qualified democracy does not seek to create a permanent ruling class, but to establish minimum standards of civic reliability that apply equally to anyone who wishes to exercise public power. They emphasize that universal suffrage and the right to stand for election are preserved, provided that candidates meet transparent and publicly justified criteria. In this view, the objective is not to replace popular judgment but to protect it from manipulation and unqualified leadership through procedural safeguards.

=== Institutional capture ===
A second recurring concern is the possibility of institutional capture of the bodies responsible for qualification and oversight. Critics warn that if these institutions are not properly designed, they could be co-opted by partisan, economic or ideological interests and used to exclude political opponents under the guise of ethical or civic evaluation.

Theoretical models of qualified democracy explicitly acknowledge this risk and treat it as a central design challenge. In response, they propose plural and decentralized arrangements, in which multiple accredited institutions—such as universities, professional associations and independent civic organizations—share responsibility for evaluation under common regulatory frameworks. Mechanisms for transparency, public justification, judicial review and external auditing are presented as essential to reduce the likelihood of capture and to maintain public trust in the system.

=== Conflicts with political equality ===
A third criticism focuses on the relationship between qualified democracy and the principle of political equality. From egalitarian perspectives, any additional barrier to candidacy can be seen as a limitation on the equal right of citizens to run for office, potentially privileging those who are better positioned to meet formal requirements.

Supporters of qualified-democracy models distinguish between equality of political rights and equality of suitability for specific public functions. They note that most constitutional systems already impose certain eligibility criteria (such as age, citizenship or legal capacity) that are not generally viewed as incompatible with democracy. From this standpoint, civic–ethical qualification is presented as an extension of these existing requirements, grounded in the need to protect the electorate from serious institutional harms. The emphasis is placed on ensuring that criteria are minimal, proportionate, non-discriminatory and subject to public scrutiny.

== Comparison with other governance models ==
Qualified democracy is often compared to other models that link political power with competence or expertise. It shares some concerns with technocracy and meritocracy, but differs from them in important ways.

Unlike technocracy, which prioritizes decision-making by technical experts and can reduce the role of electoral politics, qualified democracy retains competitive elections and popular sovereignty as central components. Its focus is less on replacing democratic processes with expert rule and more on embedding professional and ethical standards within those processes.

Compared to meritocracy, which emphasizes achievement and performance in various domains, qualified democracy directs its criteria specifically to civic and ethical dimensions of political leadership, rather than to socio-economic success in general.

When contrasted with standard liberal representative democracy, qualified democracy can be seen as a response to perceived weaknesses in existing mechanisms for accountability, integrity and protection against capture, while attempting to preserve the fundamental features of democratic representation.

== See also ==
- Democratic theory
- Political ethics
- Meritocracy
- Mixed government
- Technocracy
- Good governance
- Rule of law
