= Mixed government =

Government combining elements of monarchy, aristocracy and democracy

Mixed government, or mixed constitution, is a form of government that combines elements of democracy, aristocracy, and monarchy, ostensibly making impossible their respective degenerations, which are conceived in Aristotle's Politics as anarchy, oligarchy, and tyranny. The idea was popularized during classical antiquity in order to describe the stability, the innovation and the success of the republic as a form of government developed under the Roman constitution.

Unlike classical democracy, aristocracy, or monarchy, under a mixed government rulers are elected by citizens rather than acquiring their positions by inheritance or sortition (at the Greco-Roman time, sortition was conventionally regarded as the principal characteristic of classical democracy). The concept of a mixed government was studied during the Renaissance and the Age of Reason by Niccolò Machiavelli, Giambattista Vico, Immanuel Kant, Thomas Hobbes, and others. It was and still is a very important theory among supporters of republicanism. Various schools have described modern polities, such as the European Union and the United States, as possessing mixed constitutions.

== Ancient Greek philosophers ==
Plato in his book The Republic divided governments into five basic types (four being existing forms and one being Plato's ideal form, which exists "only in speech"):

- democracy: government by the many
- oligarchy: government by the few
- timocracy: government by the honored or valued
- tyranny: government by one for himself
- aristocracy: government by the best (Plato's ideal form of government)

Plato found flaws with all existing forms of government and thus concluded that aristocracy, which emphasizes virtue and wisdom, is the purest form of government. Aristotle largely embraced Plato's ideas and in his Politics three types (excluding timocracy) are discussed in detail. Aristotle considers constitutional government (a combination of oligarchy and democracy under law) the ideal form of government, but he observes that none of the three are healthy and that states will cycle between the three forms in an abrupt and chaotic process known as the kyklos or anacyclosis. In his Politics, he lists a number of theories of how to create a stable government. One of these options is creating a government that is a mix of all three forms of government. Polybius argued that most states have a government system that is composed of "more than one" of these basic principles, which then was called a mixed government system.

== Roman era ==
The ideal of a mixed government was popularized by Polybius, who saw the Roman Republic as a manifestation of Aristotle's theory (Millar, 2002). Monarchy was embodied by the consuls, the aristocracy by the Senate and democracy by the elections and great public gatherings of the assemblies. Each institution complements and also checks the others, presumably guaranteeing stability and prosperity. Polybius was very influential and his ideas were embraced by Cicero (Millar, 2002).

== Middle Ages ==
St. Thomas Aquinas argued in his letter On Kingship that a monarchy, with some limitations set by an aristocracy and democratic elements, was the best and most just form of government. He also emphasized the monarch's duty to uphold the divine and natural law and abide by limitations imposed on the monarch by custom and existing law.

== Renaissance, Reformation and Enlightenment ==
Cicero became extremely well regarded during the Renaissance and many of his ideas were embraced. Polybius was also rediscovered and the positive view of mixed governments became a central aspect of Renaissance political science integrated into the developing notion of republicanism. In order to minimise the misuse of political power, John Calvin advocated a mixture of aristocracy and democracy as the best form of government. He praised the advantages of democracy: "It is an invaluable gift if God allows a people to elect its overlords and magistrates". To further safeguard the rights and liberties of those who are ordinary, Calvin also favored the distribution of power to several political institutions (separation of powers). Mixed government theories became extremely popular in the Enlightenment and were discussed in detail by Thomas Hobbes, John Locke, Giambattista Vico, Montesquieu, Jean-Jacques Rousseau and Immanuel Kant. Apart from his contemporaries, only Montesquieu became widely acknowledged as the author of a concept of separation of powers (although he wrote rather on their "distribution").

According to some scholars, for example, Heinrich August Winkler, the notion also influenced the writers of the United States Constitution who based the idea of checks and balances, in part, upon the ancient theory. The constitution of Britain during the Victorian Era with a Parliament composed of the Sovereign (monarchy), a House of Lords (aristocracy) and House of Commons (democracy) is a prime example of a mixed constitution in the 19th century. This political system had its roots in two closely related developments in seventeenth-century England. First, a series of political upheavals—the Civil War (Puritan Revolution), the exclusion crisis of 1679–1681, and the Glorious Revolution of 1688. Second, an intense public debate about the best, most liberal and most stable form of government. Its main participants were John Milton, John Locke, Algernon Sidney and James Harrington. Their thinking became the basis of the radical Whig ideology. It "described two sorts of threats to political freedom: a general decay of the people which would invite the intrusion of evil and despotic rulers, and the encroachment of executive authority upon the legislature, the attempt that power always made to subdue the liberty protected by mixed government. The American Revolution revealed that this radical Whig understanding of politics had embedded itself deeply in American minds. ... Radical Whig perceptions of politics attracted widespread support in America because they revived the traditional concerns of a Protestant culture that had always verged on Puritanism. That moral decay threatened free government could not come as a surprise to a people whose fathers had fled England to escape sin".

18th-century Whigs, or commonwealthmen, such as John Trenchard, Thomas Gordon and Benjamin Hoadly "praised the mixed constitution of monarchy, aristocracy, and democracy, and they attributed English liberty to it; and like Locke they postulated a state of nature from which rights arose which the civil polity, created by mutual consent, guaranteed; they argued that a contract formed government and sovereignty resided in the people". So mixed government is the core of both the British form of modern-era democracy, constitutional monarchy, and the American model: republicanism. The "father" of the American constitution, James Madison, stated in Federalist Paper No. 40 that the Constitutional Convention of 1787 created a mixed constitution. Madison referred to Polybius in Federalist Paper No. 63. However, much more important was that "most" ideas that the American Revolutionaries put into their political system "were a part of the great tradition of the eighteenth-century commonwealthmen, the radical Whig ideology".

== Modern era ==
=== United States ===
One school of scholarship based mainly in the United States considers mixed government to be the central characteristic of a republic and holds that the United States has rule by the one (the President; monarchy), rule by the few (the Senate; democracy elected since 1912), and rule by the many (House of Representatives; democracy elected). Another school of thought in the U.S. says the Supreme Court has taken on the role of "The Best" in the 21st century, ensuring a continuing separation of authority by offsetting the direct election of senators and preserving the mixing of democracy and monarchy.

=== European Union ===
According to a view, in the European Union context the Commission President represents the rule by the one while the Commission represents the aristocratic dimension and the Parliament represents the democratic dimension.

== See also ==
- Anacyclosis
- Constitutionalism
- Constitutional economics
- Crowned republic
- Fusion of powers
- Rule according to higher law
- Plato's Republic
- Aristotle's Politics
- Qualified democracy
- Separation of powers
