= David Williamson, Lord Balgray =

Scottish lawyer

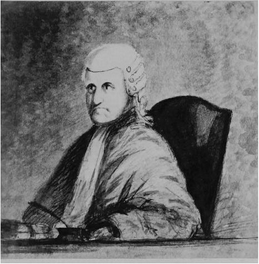
David Williamson, Lord Balgray by Robert Scott Moncrieff around 1815

The Hon David Robertson Williamson, Lord Balgray (1761–1837) was an 18th-century Scottish lawyer who rose to be a Senator of the College of Justice.

== Life ==
He was born David Williamson in 1761, the son of Alexander Williamson of Balgray (1722-1804) and his wife Christian Robertson.

He owned the estate of Balgray, just north of Lockerbie in south-west Scotland.

In 1811 he replaced Alexander Fraser Tytler, Lord Woodhouselee as a Senator of the College of Justice.

On his death in 1837 he was replaced by John Cunninghame, Lord Cunninghame.

== Family ==
He married a cousin, William "Wilhelmina" Robertson of Lawers. He afterwards styled himself David Robertson Williamson.

His nephew was also called David Robertson Williamson (1830-1919).
