= Anacyclosis =

Political doctrine

The political doctrine of anacyclosis (or anakyklosis from Greek: ἀνακύκλωσις) is a cyclical theory of political evolution. The theory of anacyclosis is based upon the Greek typology of constitutional forms of rule by the one, the few, and the many. Anacyclosis states that three basic forms of "benign" government (monarchy, aristocracy, and democracy) are inherently weak and unstable, tending to degenerate rapidly into the three basic forms of "malignant" government (tyranny, oligarchy, and ochlocracy).

According to the doctrine, "benign" governments have the interests of all at heart, whereas "malignant" governments have the interests of a select few at heart. However, all six are considered unworkable because the first three rapidly transform into the latter three due to political corruption.

The idea of anacyclosis influenced theorists of republicanism. Some of them, including Aristotle, Cicero, Machiavelli, Vico and Kant suggested that mixed government might help to stabilize republics and prevent permanent anacyclosis.

== Polybius' sequence ==
Polybius' sequence of anacyclosis proceeds in the following order: 1. monarchy, 2. kingship, 3. tyranny, 4. aristocracy, 5. oligarchy, 6. democracy, and 7. ochlocracy.

According to Polybius' elaboration of the theory, the state begins in a form of primitive monarchy. The state will emerge from monarchy under the leadership of an influential and wise king; this represents the emergence of "kingship". Political power will pass by hereditary succession to the children of the king, who will abuse their authority for their own gain; this represents the degeneration of kingship into "tyranny".

Some of the more influential and powerful men of the state will grow weary of the abuses of tyrants, and will overthrow them; this represents the ascendancy of "aristocracy" (as well as the end of the "rule by the one" and the beginning of the "rule by the few").

Just as the descendants of kings, however, political influence will pass to the descendants of the aristocrats, and these descendants will begin to abuse their power and influence, as the tyrants before them; this represents the decline of aristocracy and the beginning of "oligarchy". As Polybius explains, the people will by this stage in the political evolution of the state decide to take political matters into their own hands.

This point of the cycle sees the emergence of "democracy", as well as the beginning of "rule by the many". In the same way that the descendants of kings and aristocrats abused their political status, so too will the descendants of democrats. Accordingly, democracy degenerates into "ochlocracy", literally, "mob-rule". In an ochlocracy, according to Polybius, the people of the state will become corrupted, and will develop a sense of entitlement and will be conditioned to accept the pandering of demagogues. Essentially, government becomes a puppet show because a transition in power does not affect a civilian on a day-to-day basis.

Eventually, the state will be engulfed in chaos, and the competing claims of demagogues will culminate in a single (sometimes virtuous) demagogue claiming absolute power, bringing the state full-circle back to monarchy.

== Origin ==
This theory was developed in stages by the ancient Greek philosophers Plato and Aristotle, but is mainly attributable to the ancient Greek historian Polybius. Polybius' explanation of anacyclosis is found in Book VI of The Histories.

== Historical references ==
Cicero describes anacyclosis in his philosophical work De re publica.

Machiavelli references anacyclosis in Book I, Chapter II in his Discourses on Livy.

Francesco Sansovino described anacyclosis in his 1583 work Propositioni, Overo Considerationi in Materia di Cose di Stato Sotto Titolo di Avvertimenti, Avvedimenti Civili & Concetti Politici.

John Adams described anacyclosis in Letter XXXI (Ancient Republics, and Opinions of Philosophers) of his 1787 work Defense of the Constitutions of the United States.

== Modern analysis ==
Anacyclosis was evaluated in detail by F. W. Walbank in his A Historical Commentary on Polybius (Oxford, 1957, Volume I, Book VI).

Anacyclosis was also analyzed at length by G. W. Trompf in The Idea of Historical Recurrence in Western Thought (University of California, 1979, Chapter 1: The Polybian Anacyclosis or Cycle of Governments).

In 2013, The Institute for Anacyclosis, a nonpartisan, nonprofit corporation, was incorporated to research anacyclosis and related ideas. The Institute for Anacyclosis has developed an updated model of anacyclosis based on the classical Polybian version.

Jean-Claude Milner in his 2016 book Rereading the Revolution uses anacyclosis to analyse the French Revolution and its consequences.

== See also ==
- Australia
- Kyklos
- Mixed government
- Social cycle theory
- Tytler cycle
- Strauss-Howe generational theory
- United Kingdom
