= John Cunninghame, Lord Cunninghame =

Scottish lawyer

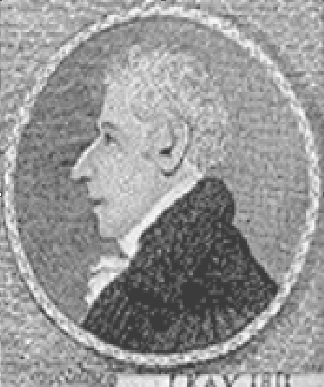
John Cunninghame by John Kay

John Cunninghame, Lord Cunninghame (1782–1854) was a 19th-century Scottish lawyer who rose to be both Solicitor General of Scotland and a Senator of the College of Justice.

== Life ==
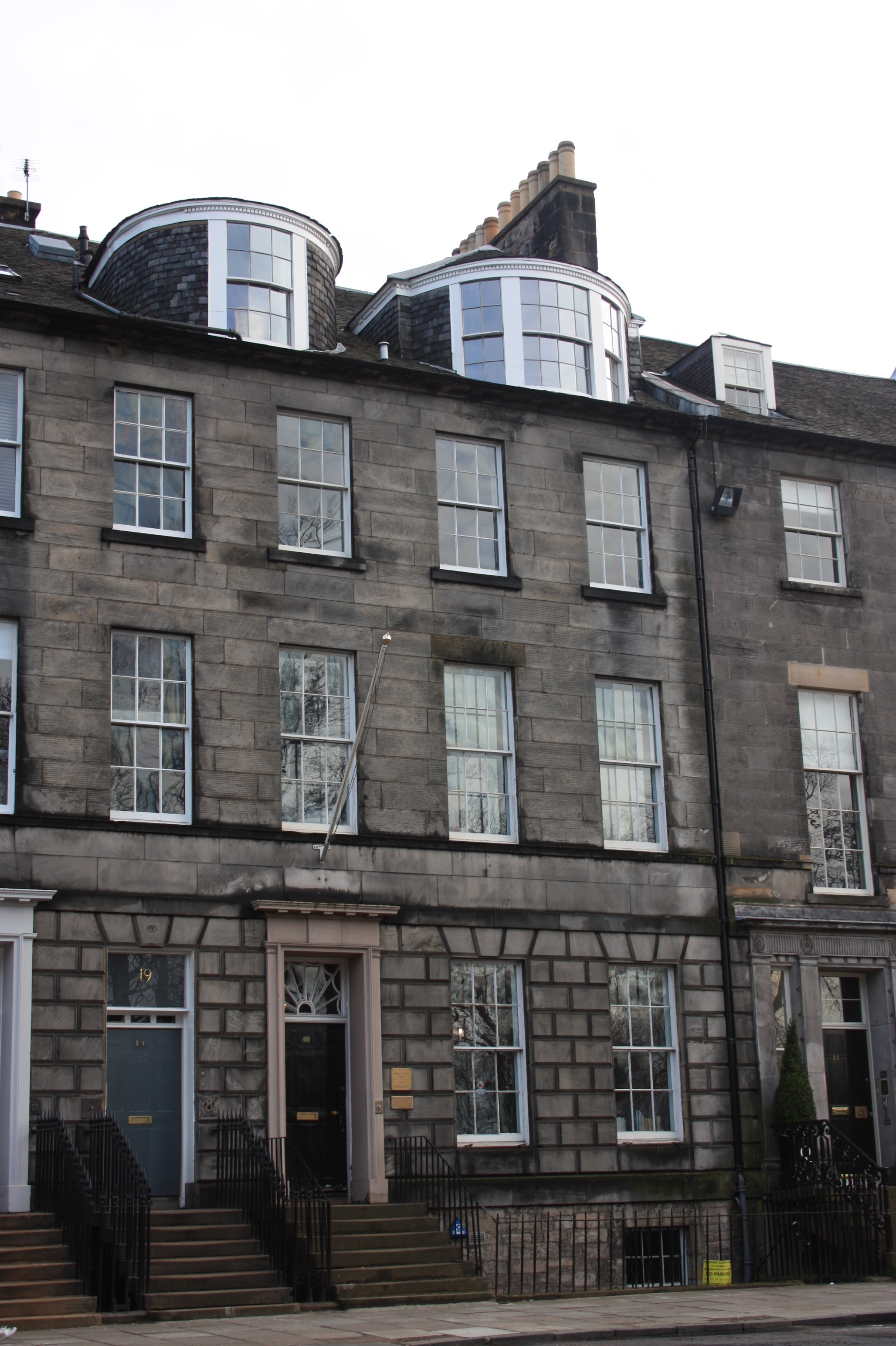
20 Queen Street, Edinburgh

He was born in Port Glasgow in 1782 the eldest son of John Cunninghame, a banker in Greenock. He was apprenticed as a lawyer with Mr McNab WS who had offices at 89 Princes Street in Edinburgh.

In 1805 he is listed as John Cunningham Writer to the Signet operating from 5 George Street in Edinburgh.

He qualified as an advocate in March 1807. In 1810 he was operating as an advocate from 20 Queen Street. The building still survives. In 1830 he was appointed Deputy to the Lord Advocate, Francis Jeffrey, Lord Jeffrey. In 1831 he was appointed Sheroff of Elgin and Moray.

In 1835 he succeeded Duncan McNeill as Solicitor General for Scotland. He then lived at 80 Great King Street in Edinburgh's Second New Town.

In 1837 he succeeded David Williamson, Lord Balgray as a Senator of the College of Justice. His position as Solicitor General was filled by Andrew Rutherfurd, Lord Rutherfurd.

He resigned due to ill health in 1853 and died in Edinburgh on 26 October 1854.

== Family ==
He was married to Margaret Richard Fisher Trotter, daughter of Lt General Alexander Trotter and sister of Richard Trotter of Mortonhall.

== Artistic recognition ==
In 1811 he was portrayed by John Kay.

His portrait in the role of Solicitor General of Scotland was made in 1836 and is held in the Scottish National Portrait Gallery.
