= Ann Fraser Tytler =

Scottish novelist

- Born: c. 1783
- Died: September 3, 1857
- Occupation: Novelist
- Parents: Alexander Fraser Tytler (father); Ann Fraser of Balnain (mother)
- Relatives: Patrick Fraser Tytler

Ann Fraser Tytler (c. 1783 – September 3, 1857) was a Scottish novelist best known for her book about a shipwrecked girl, Leila (1839).

Ann Fraser Tytler was born around 1783, one of five children of historian Alexander Fraser Tytler, Lord Woodhouselee and Ann Fraser of Balnain. Her younger brother was the historian Patrick Fraser Tytler.

Fraser Tytler began writing stories for the children of her brother Patrick. She created two-book series. The Leila Howard series began with the successful Robinsonade Leila, about an eight-year-old girl who is shipwrecked along with her father, her nanny, and pet dog and cat on a lush uninhabited island. The other series was about the twins Mary and Florence. Fraser Tytler's books remained popular for much of the 19th century.

Ann Fraser Tytler died on 3 September 1857.

== Bibliography ==
- Mary and Florence: or, Grave and Gay. 1 vol. London: Hatchard, 1835.
- Mary and Florence at Sixteen: A Continuation of "Grave and Gay". 1 vol. London: Hatchard, 1838.
- Leila: or, The Island. 1 vol. London: Hatchard, 1839.
- Leila in England: A Continuation of "Leila; or, The Island". 1 vol. London: Hatchard, 1842.
- Leila at Home: A Continuation of "Leila in England". 1 vol. London: Hatchard, 1852.
