= Alexander Fraser Tytler, Lord Woodhouselee =

18th/19th-century Scottish judge and historian

Alexander Fraser Tytler Lord Woodhouselee FRSE
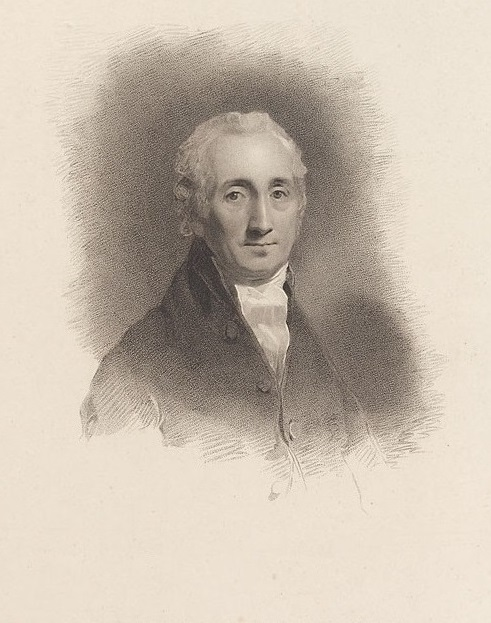
- Alexander Fraser Tytler, Lord Woodhouselee, 10 May 1813

Senator of the College of Justice
- In office 6 February 1802 – 15 November 1811
- Preceded by: John Campbell, Lord Stonefield
- Succeeded by: David Williamson, Lord Balgray

Personal details
- Born: 15 October 1747 Edinburgh, Scotland
- Died: 5 January 1813 (aged 65) Edinburgh, Scotland

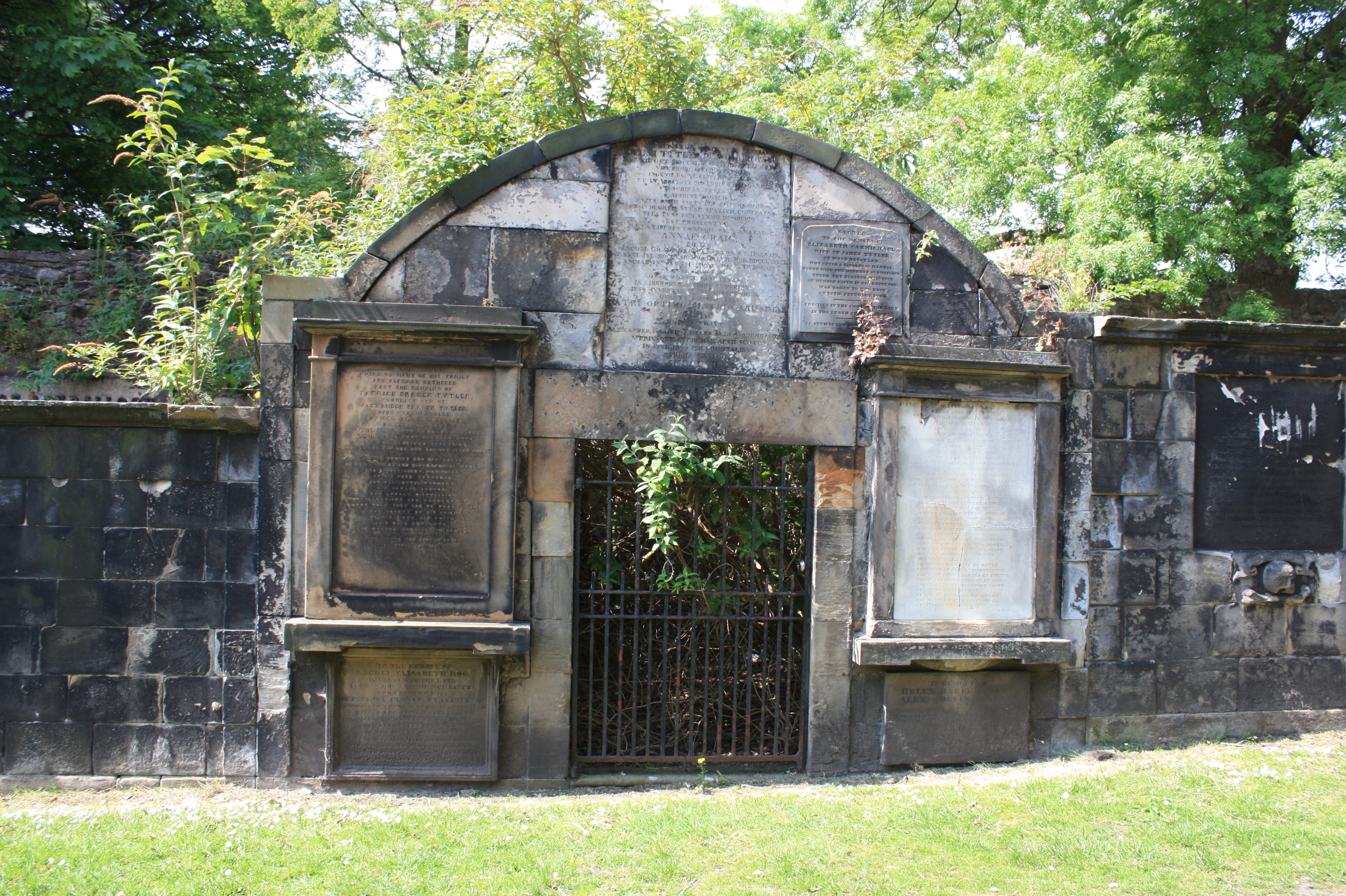
The Fraser Tytler family vault, Greyfriars Kirkyard

Alexander Fraser Tytler, Lord Woodhouselee FRSE (15 October 1747 – 5 January 1813) was a Scottish advocate, judge, writer, and historian who was a Professor of Universal History and of Greek and Roman Antiquities at the University of Edinburgh.

== Life ==
Tytler was born in the Old Town of Edinburgh, the eldest son of Ann Craig of Costerton (1722–1783) and William Tytler of Woodhouselee, the author of Inquiry into the Evidence against Mary Queen of Scots. He was educated at Edinburgh High School and Kensington Academy in London (1763/64), and then studied law at the University of Edinburgh, qualifying as an advocate in 1770.

In 1771, he made a tour of France with his cousin, James Ker of Blackshiels.

In 1773 he was living and working with his father, also an advocate, at Campbells Close on the Royal Mile.

In 1780 he was appointed joint professor of Civil History at the University of Edinburgh alongside Prof Pringle. He then moved to Browns Square. He became sole professor in 1786 on the death of Pringle.

In 1790 he became Judge Advocate of Scotland. In 1795 he became seriously ill, and could not attend court.

In 1802 he became a Lord of Session in the Scottish Courts, with the judicial title Lord Woodhouselee.

Tytler's other positions included Senator of the College of Justice and George Commissioner of Justiciary in Scotland. Tytler was a friend of Robert Burns, and prevailed upon him to remove lines from his poem "Tam o' Shanter" which were insulting to the legal and clerical professions.

In 1811 he retired from his role as Senator of the College of Justice, with his place being filled by David Williamson, Lord Balgray.

He died at his townhouse at 65 Princes Street in Edinburgh and was buried in Greyfriars Kirkyard. The vault lies on the west side of the section known as the Covenanter's Prison, which is generally closed to public view.

== Family ==
Ann Fraser, c. 1804, by Henry Raeburn, Brooklyn Museum.

In 1776 he married Ann Fraser of Balnain. Their children included Patrick Fraser Tytler, traveller and historian, James Fraser Tytler, a lawyer, Alexander Fraser Tytler, Assistant Judge and author in Bengal, India, and William Fraser Tytler, a lawyer and historian, and novelist Ann Fraser Tytler.

== Translation ==
Tytler wrote a treatise that is important in the history of translation theory, the Essay on the Principles of Translation (London, 1791). It has been argued in a 1975 book by Gan Kechao that Yan Fu's famous translator's dictum of fidelity, clarity and elegance came from Tytler.

Tytler said that translation should fully represent the 1) ideas and 2) style of the original and should 3) possess the ease of original composition.

== Quotations on democracy ==
In his Lectures, Tytler expressed a critical view of democracy in general and representative democracies such as republics in particular. He believed that "a pure democracy is a chimera", and that "all government is essentially of the nature of a monarchy".

In discussing the Athenian democracy, after noting that a great number of the population were actually enslaved, he went on to say, "Nor were the superior classes in the actual enjoyment of a rational liberty and independence. They were perpetually divided into factions, which servilely ranked themselves under the banners of the contending demagogues; and these maintained their influence over their partisans by the most shameful corruption and bribery, of which the means were supplied alone by the plunder of the public money".

Speaking about the measure of freedom enjoyed by the people in a republic or democracy, Tytler wrote, "The people flatter themselves that they have the sovereign power. These are, in fact, words without meaning. It is true they elected governors; but how are these elections brought about? In every instance of election by the mass of a people—through the influence of those governors themselves, and by means the most opposite to a free and disinterested choice, by the basest corruption and bribery. But those governors once selected, where is the boasted freedom of the people? They must submit to their rule and control, with the same abandonment of their natural liberty, the freedom of their will, and the command of their actions, as if they were under the rule of a monarch".

Tytler dismisses the more optimistic vision of democracy by commentators such as Montesquieu as "nothing better than an Utopian theory, a splendid chimera, descriptive of a state of society that never did, and never could exist; a republic not of men, but of angels", for "While man is being instigated by the love of power—a passion visible in an infant, and common to us even with the inferior animals—he will seek personal superiority in preference to every matter of a general concern".

"Or at best, he will employ himself in advancing the public good, as the means of individual distinction and elevation: he will promote the interest of the state from the selfish but most useful passion of making himself considerable in that establishment which he labors to aggrandize. Such is the true picture of man as a political agent".

Tytler admits that there are individual exceptions to the rule, and that he is ready to allow "that this form of government is the best adapted to produce, though not the most frequent, yet the most striking, examples of virtue in individuals", paradoxically because a "democratic government opposes more impediments to disinterested patriotism than any other form. To surmount these, a pitch of virtue is necessary which, in other situations, where the obstacles are less great and numerous, is not called in to exertion. The nature of a republican government gives to every member of the state an equal right to cherish views of ambition, and to aspire to the highest offices of the commonwealth; it gives to every individual of the same title with his fellows to aspire at the government of the whole".

Tytler believed that democratic forms of government such as those of Greece and Rome, have a natural evolution from initial virtue, toward eventual corruption and decline. In Greece, for example, Tytler argues that "the patriotic spirit and love of ingenious freedom ... became gradually corrupted as the nation advanced in power and splendour".

Tytler further states: "Patriotism always exists in the greatest degree in rude nations, and in an early period of society. Like all other affections and passions, it operates with the greatest force where it meets with the greatest difficulties ... but in a state of ease and safety, as if wanting its appropriate nourishment, it languishes and decays". ... "It is a law of nature to which no experience has ever furnished an exception, that the rising grandeur and opulence of a nation must be balanced by the decline of its heroic virtues".

== Debatable attribution ==
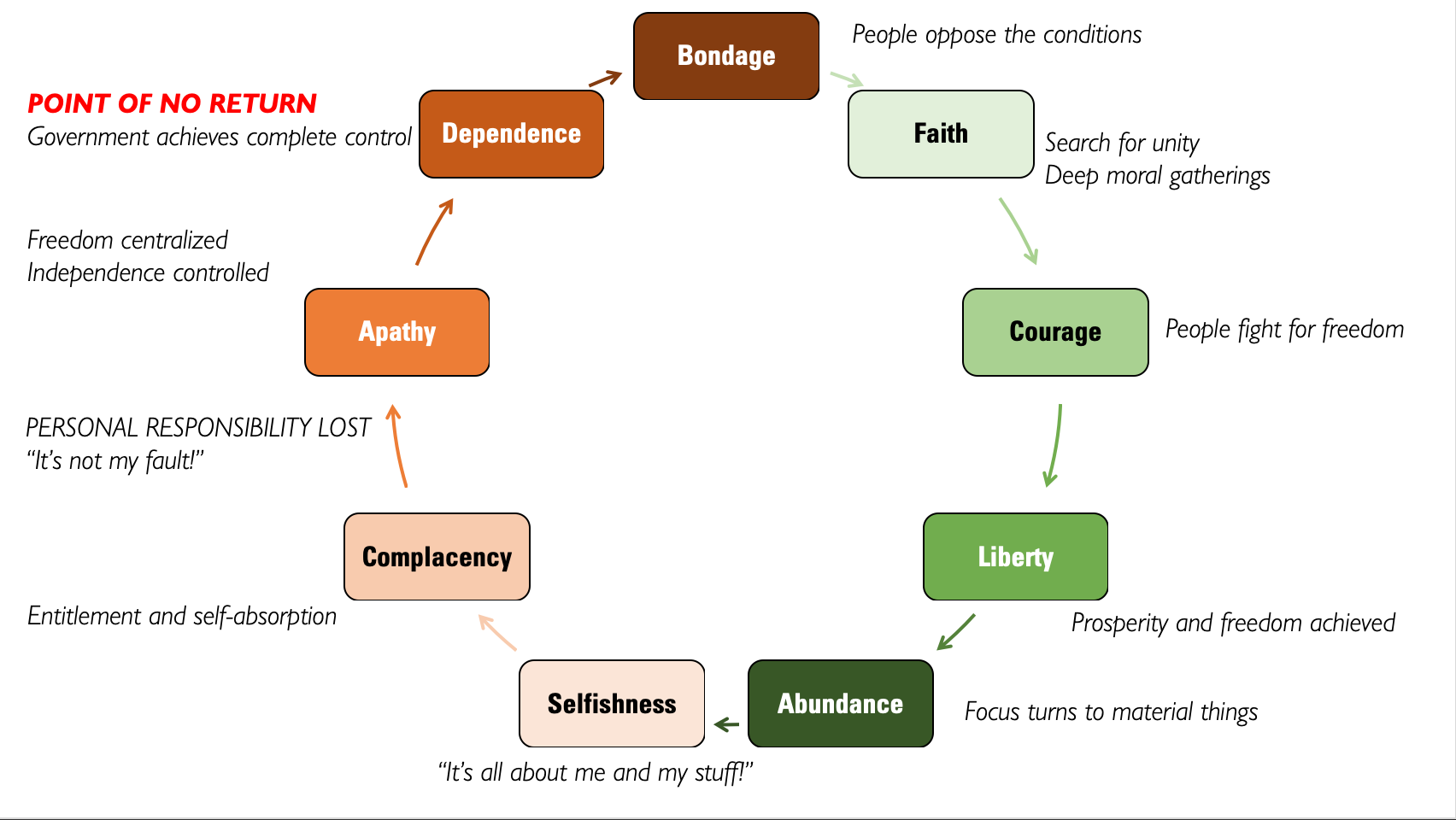
A graphical representation of the Tytler cycle.

The following quotation has been attributed to Tytler.

A democracy is always temporary in nature; it simply cannot exist as a permanent form of government. A democracy will continue to exist up until the time that voters discover that they can vote themselves generous gifts from the public treasury. From that moment on, the majority always votes for the candidates who promise the most benefits from the public treasury, with the result that every democracy will finally collapse due to loose fiscal policy, which is always followed by a dictatorship.

The average age of the world's greatest civilizations from the beginning of history has been about 200 years. During those 200 years, these nations always progressed through the following sequence: From bondage to spiritual faith; From spiritual faith to great courage; From courage to liberty; From liberty to abundance; From abundance to selfishness; From selfishness to complacency; From complacency to apathy; From apathy to dependence; From dependence back into bondage.

This text was popularized as part of a longer piece commenting on the 2000 U.S. presidential election, which began circulating on the Internet during or shortly after the election's controversial conclusion.

There is no reliable record of Alexander Tytler's having written any part of the text. In fact, it actually comprises two parts which did not begin to appear together until the 1970s. The first paragraph's earliest known appearance is in an op-ed piece by Elmer T. Peterson in the 9 December 1951 The Daily Oklahoman, which attributed it to Tytler:

Two centuries ago, a somewhat obscure Scotsman named Tytler made this profound observation: "A democracy cannot exist as a permanent form of government. It can only exist until the majority discovers it can vote itself largess out of the public treasury. After that, the majority always votes for the candidate promising the most benefits with the result the democracy collapses because of the loose fiscal policy ensuing, always to be followed by a dictatorship, then a monarchy".

The list beginning "From bondage to spiritual faith" is commonly known as the "Tytler Cycle" or the "Fatal Sequence". Its first known appearance was in a 1943 speech by Henning W. Prentiss, Jr., president of the Armstrong Cork Company and former president of the National Association of Manufacturers, delivered at the February 1943 convocation of the General Alumni Society of the University of Pennsylvania. The speech was subsequently published under the titles "The Cult of Competency" and "Industrial Management in a Republic".

== Works ==
- (1771). Piscatory Eclogues, with other Poetical Miscellanies of Phinehas Fletcher.
- (1778). The Decisions of the Court of Sessions, from its First Institution to the Present Time, supplementary volumes (2nd, 3rd and 4th) to Lord Kames's Dictionary of Decisions.
- (1782). Plan and Outline of a Course of Lectures on Universal History.
- (1784). Essay on the Life and Character of Petrarch, with Translation of Seven Sonnets.
- (1788). Life and Writings of Dr John Gregory.
- (1791). Essay on the Principles of Translation.
- (1792). The Robbers: A Tragedy, translation of Schiller's Die Räuber.
- (1798). A Critical Examination of Mr. Whitaker's Course of Hannibal over the Alps.
- (1799). Ireland Profiting by Example, a political pamphlet.
- (1800). Essay on the Military Law and the Practice of Courts-Martial.
- (1801). Elements of General History, Ancient and Modern (an extended version of his 1782 lectures).
- (1801). Essay on Laura and Petrarch.
- (1807). Memoirs of the Life and Writings of the Honourable Henry Home of Kames.

== See also ==
- Dynastic cycle, Chinese history
- Playfair cycle
- Strauss–Howe generational theory
- Translation theory

General:

- Anacyclosis
- Cyclical theory
- Social cycle theory
- Societal collapse
