= Patrick Fraser Tytler =

Scottish historian (1791–1849)

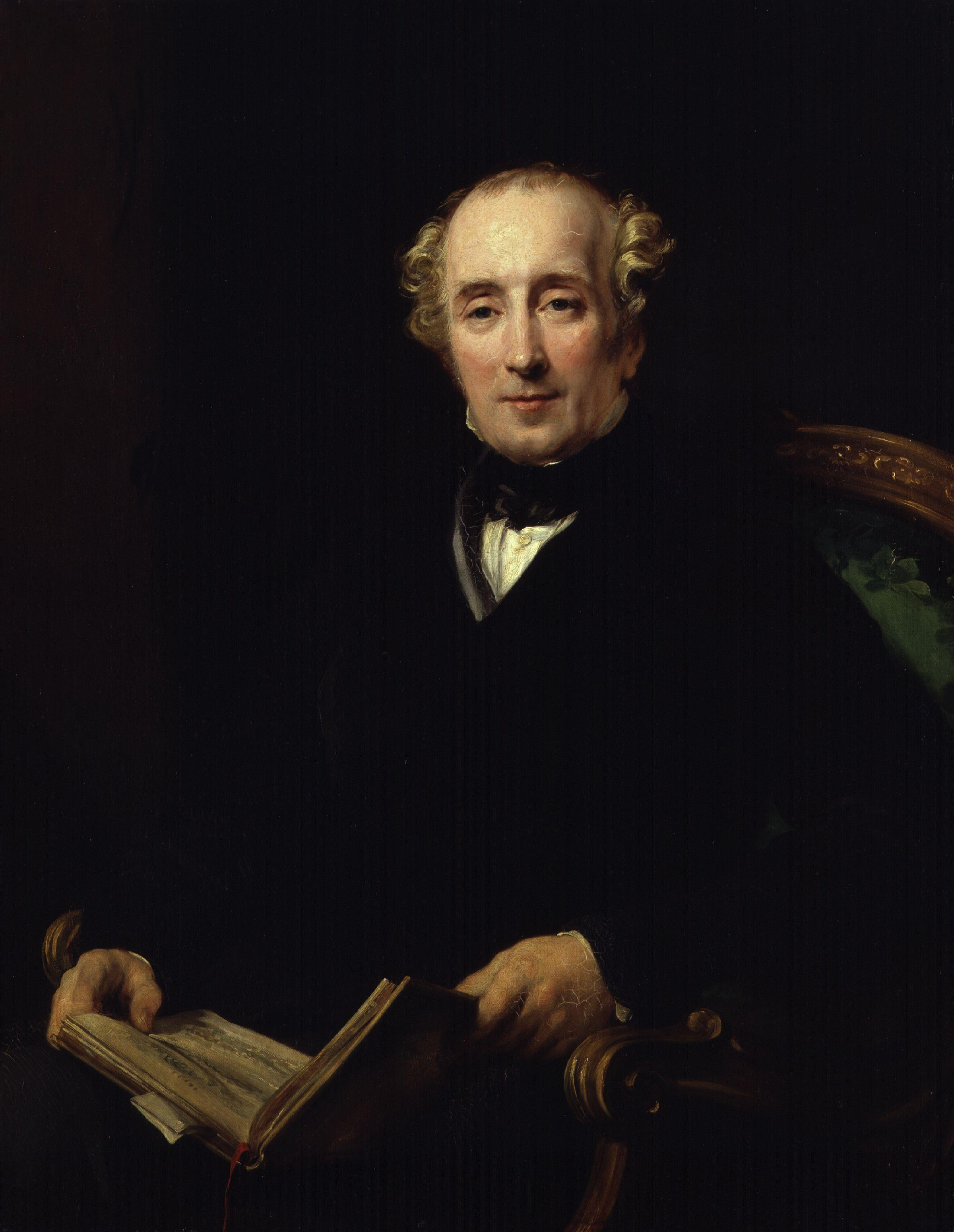
Patrick Fraser Tytler, by Margaret Sarah Carpenter, exhibited 1845

Patrick Fraser Tytler FRSE FSA (Scot) (30 August 1791 – 24 December 1849) was a Scottish advocate and historian. He was described as the "Episcopalian historian of a Presbyterian country".

== Life ==
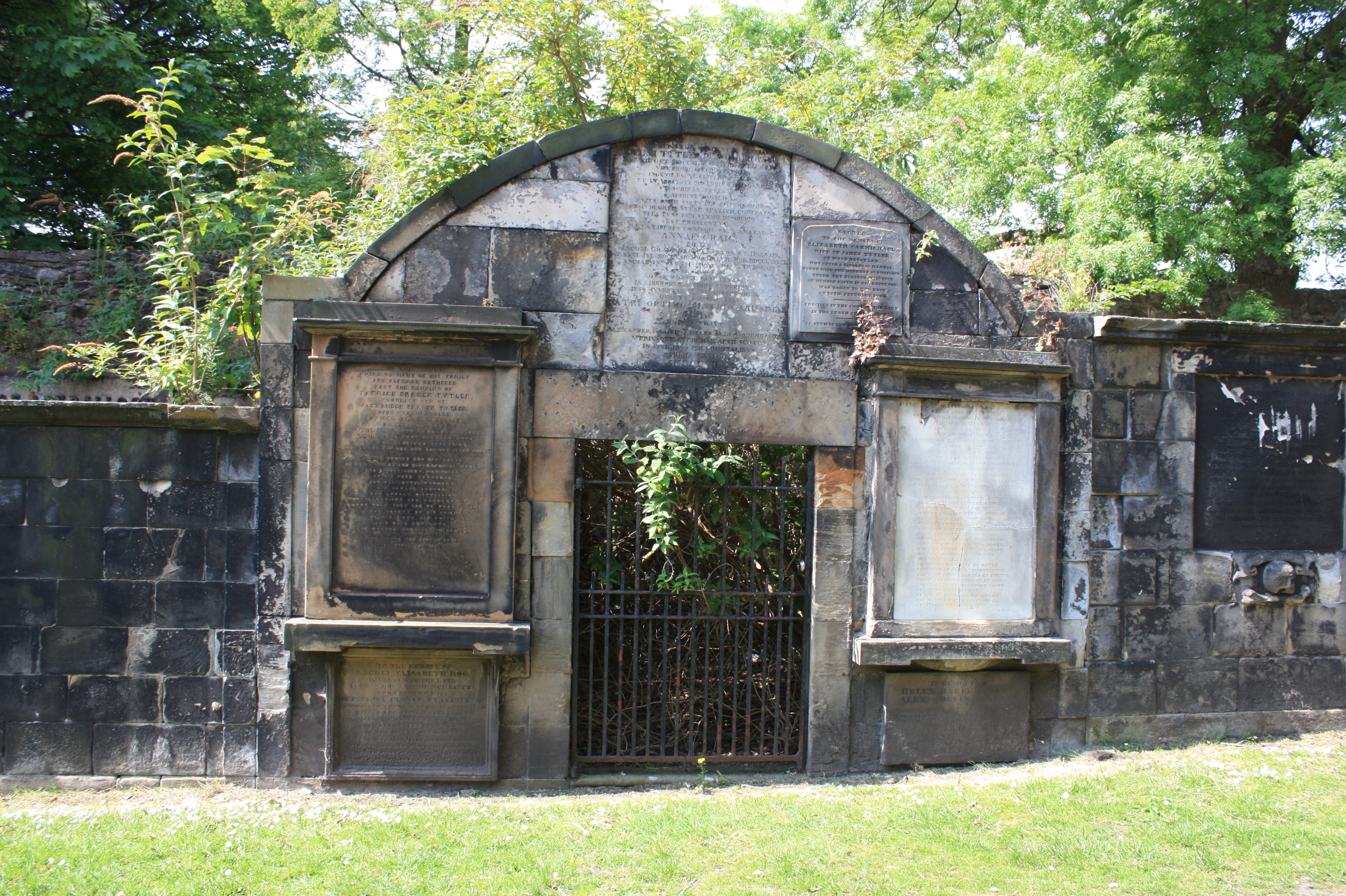
The Fraser Tytler family vault, Greyfriars Kirkyard

The son of Alexander Fraser Tytler, Lord Woodhouselee, he was born in a house on George Street in Edinburgh's New Town. He was named after his paternal uncle, Col Patrick Tytler. He was educated at the Edinburgh High School.

He was admitted to the Faculty of Advocates in Edinburgh in 1813; in 1816 he became King's counsel in the Exchequer, and practised as an advocate until 1832. At this time he was living at 36 Melville Street, a large terraced townhouse in Edinburgh's west end.

He then moved to London, and it was largely owing to his efforts that a scheme for publishing state papers was carried out. Tytler was one of the founders of the Bannatyne Club and of the English Historical Society.

He died at Great Malvern on 24 December 1849. His body was returned to Edinburgh for burial in the family vault, which lies within the sealed south-west section of Greyfriars Kirkyard known as the Covenanter's Prison.

His biography (1859) was written by his friend John William Burgon.

== Family ==
Tytler first married Rachel Elisabeth Hog (sister of James Maitland Hog FRSE) on 30 March 1826 at Newliston and together they had 3 children, including Mary Stewart Fraser Tytler (1827–1887) who is buried in Grange Cemetery rather than in the family vault. Rachel died on 15 April 1835.

He then married on either 12 or 22 August 1845, in Richmond, his cousin, Anastasia Bonar, daughter of Thomson Bonar (1780–1828) of Campden, Kent, by his spouse Anastasia Jessie Gascoigne, widow of Charles Gascoigne, daughter of Matthew Guthrie of Halkerton.

== Works ==
Tytler is most noted for his literary output. He contributed to Archibald Alison's Travels in France (1815); his first independent essays were papers in Blackwood's Magazine. His major work, the History of Scotland (1828–1843), covered the period between 1249 and 1603. A second edition was published in 1841–1843. The seventh volume deals with the reign of Mary, Queen of Scots after her marriage with Darnley.

His other works include:

- contributions to George Thomson's Select Melodies of Scotland (1824)
- Life of James Crichton of Cluny, commonly called the Admirable Crichton (1819; 2nd ed., 1823)
- a Memoir of Sir Thomas Craig of Riccarton (1823)
- an Essay on the Revival of Greek Literature in Italy, and The Life of John Wycliffe, published anonymously (1826)
- Lives of Scottish Worthies, for Murray's Family Library (1831–1833)
- Historical View of the Progress of Discovery in America (1832)
- Life of Sir Walter Raleigh (1833)
- Memoirs of the War Carried on in Scotland and Ireland in 1689–1691 (1833)
- Life of Henry VIII. (1837)
- England under the Reigns of Edward VI. and Mary, from original letters (1839)
- Notes on the Darnley Jewel (1843)
- Portraits of Mary Queen of Scots (1845).
