= Commonwealth (U.S. state) =

Term used in U.S. state names

The four U.S. states (highlighted in green) that self-designate as commonwealths: Kentucky, Massachusetts, Pennsylvania, and Virginia

Commonwealth is a term used by four of the 50 states of the United States in their full official names: Kentucky, Massachusetts, Pennsylvania, and Virginia. "Commonwealth" is a traditional English term used to describe a political community as having been founded for the common good, and shares some similarities with the Latin phrase "res publica" ('the public thing'), which ultimately is the origin of the word "republic".

The "commonwealth" appellation is merely stylistic and carries no legal or political significance. The four states that use this term are all in the Eastern United States, and prior to the formation of the United States in 1776 were British colonial possessions (at the time, Kentucky was a part of colonial Virginia). As such, they share a strong influence of English common law in some of their laws and institutions.

== Definition ==
The term commonwealth does not describe or provide for any specific political status or legal relationship when used by a state. Those that do use it are equal to those that do not. A traditional English term for a political community founded for the common good, it is used symbolically to emphasize that these states had a "government based on the common consent of the people". It refers to the common "wealth", or welfare, of the public and is derived from a loose translation of the Latin term res publica. (Note: cf. the 17th-century Commonwealth of England.) Premodern English used the alternative term "commonwealth" in such sense in place of the now singularly standard term "republic".

Criminal charges in these four states are brought in the name of the Commonwealth. (Note: In California, Colorado, Illinois, Michigan, and New York, criminal charges are brought in the name of the People. In all the other states, they are brought in the name of the State. Regardless of state, federal criminal charges are always brought in the name of the United States of America.)

Besides the four aforementioned states, other states have also on occasion used the term "commonwealth" to refer to themselves:

- The term "commonwealth" is used interchangeably with the term "state" in the Constitution of Vermont, but the act of Congress admitting that state to the Union calls it "the State of Vermont".
- Delaware was primarily referred to as a "state" in its 1776 Constitution; however, the term commonwealth was also used in one of its articles.

Two U.S. territories are also designated as commonwealths: Puerto Rico and the Northern Mariana Islands. When used in connection with areas under U.S. sovereignty that are not states, the term broadly describes an area that is self-governing under a constitution of its own adoption and whose right of self-government will not be unilaterally withdrawn by the United States Congress.

== Commonwealths ==
=== Kentucky ===
On September 28, 1786, the residents of Kentucky County began petitioning the Virginia legislature for permission to become a "free and independent state, to be known by the name of the Commonwealth of Kentucky". On June 1, 1792, Kentucky County officially became a state. Like Virginia, the official title of the elected local prosecutor in each of Kentucky's political subdivisions is the commonwealth's attorney and county attorney, as opposed to state's attorney in other states or the more standard district attorney. Kentucky is the only state outside of the original Thirteen Colonies that uses commonwealth in its name.

=== Massachusetts ===
Massachusetts is officially named The Commonwealth of Massachusetts by its constitution. The name State of Massachusetts Bay was used in all acts and resolves up to 1780 and in the first draft of the constitution. The current name can be traced to the second draft of the state constitution, which was written by John Adams and ratified in 1780.

In Massachusetts, the term State is occasionally used in an official manner, usually in a compound structure rather than as a standalone noun. This is evident in the names of the Massachusetts State Police, the Massachusetts State House, and the Bridgewater State Hospital.

=== Pennsylvania ===
The Seal of Pennsylvania does not use the term, but legal processes are in the name of the Commonwealth, and it is a traditional official designation used in referring to the state. In 1776, Pennsylvania's first state constitution referred to it as both Commonwealth and State, a pattern of usage that was perpetuated in the constitutions of 1790, 1838, 1874, and 1968. (Note: A detailed history describing the origins of Pennsylvania's government, including its designation as a commonwealth from colonial times, is available from the Secretary of the Commonwealth's office.) One of Pennsylvania's two intermediate appellate courts is called the Commonwealth Court.

=== Virginia ===
The name Commonwealth of Virginia dates back to its independence from the Kingdom of Great Britain. Virginia's first constitution (adopted on June 29, 1776) directed that "Commissions and Grants shall run, In the Name of the commonwealth of Virginia, and bear test by the Governor with the Seal of the Commonwealth annexed." The secretary of the commonwealth still issues commissions in this manner.

Among other references, the constitution furthermore dictated that criminal indictments were to conclude "against the peace and dignity of the Commonwealth". Additionally, the official title of the elected local prosecutor in each of Virginia's political subdivisions is the Commonwealth's Attorney, as opposed to State's Attorney in other states or the more standard District Attorney.

In Virginia, the term state is sometimes used in an official manner, usually in a compound structure rather than as a standalone noun. This is evident in the names of the Virginia State Corporation Commission, the Virginia State Police, and the Virginia Polytechnic Institute and State University. The state university in Richmond is known as Virginia Commonwealth University; there is also a Virginia State University, located in Ettrick.

== See also ==
- Confederation
- Democracy
- Federation
