= Aristocracy =

Form of government

Aristocracy (from Ancient Greek ἀριστοκρατίᾱ (aristokratíā) 'rule of the best'; from ἄριστος (áristos) 'best' and κράτος (krátos) 'power, strength') is a form of government that places power in the hands of a small, privileged ruling class, the aristocrats.

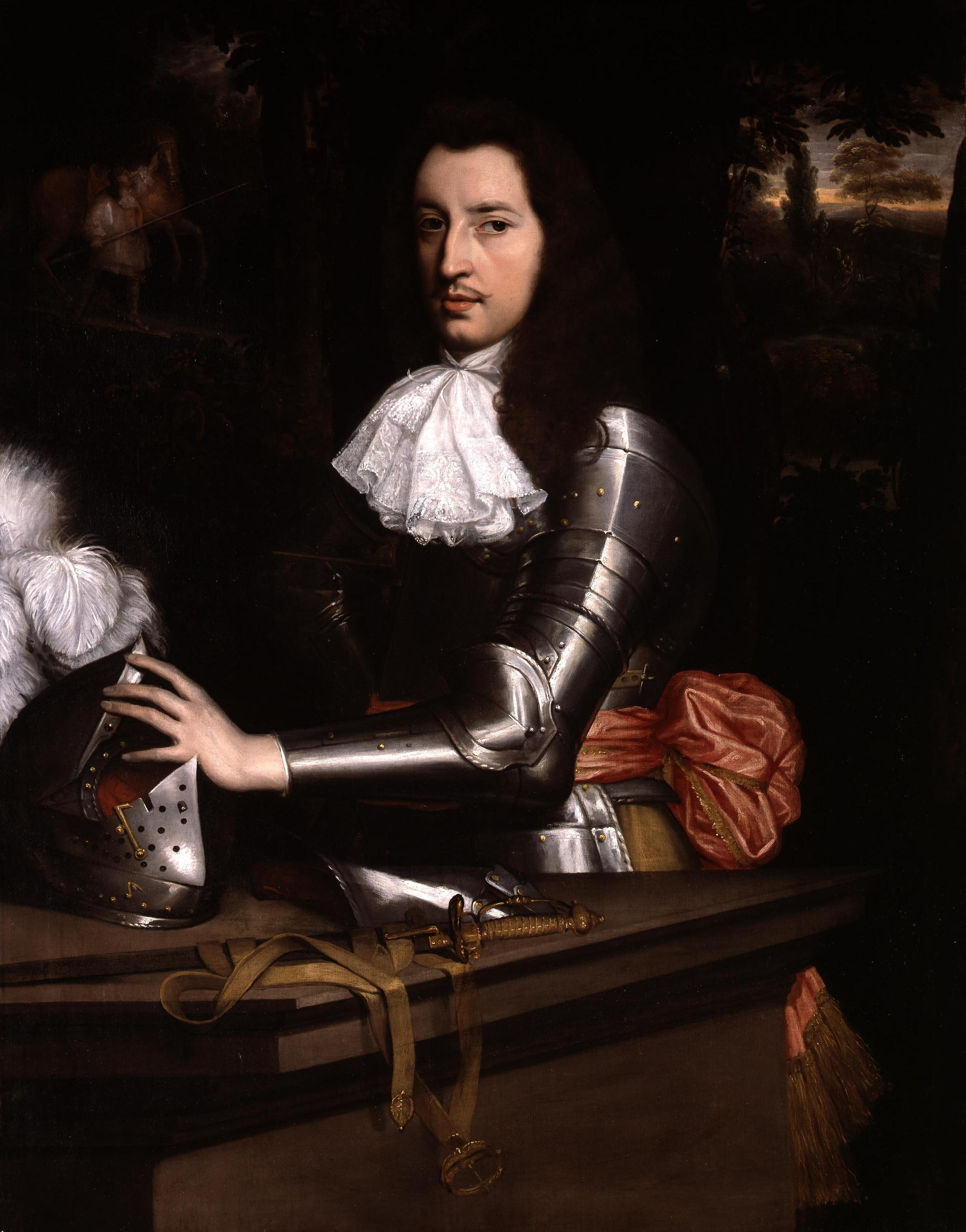
The 6th Duke of Norfolk, a 17th-century English aristocrat and politician who held the hereditary office of Earl Marshal of England

Across Europe, the aristocracy exercised immense economic, political, and social influence. In Western Christian countries, the aristocracy was mostly equal with magnates, also known as the titled or higher nobility, however the members of the more numerous social class, the untitled lower nobility (petty nobility or gentry) were not part of the aristocracy.

The modern understanding of aristocracy is different from its classical use which referred to the citizens with good qualifications to rule.

== Classical aristocracy ==
In ancient Greece, the Greeks conceived aristocracy as rule by the best-qualified citizens—and often contrasted it favorably with monarchy, rule by an individual. The term was first used by such ancient Greeks as Aristotle and Plato, who used it to describe a system where only the best of the citizens, chosen through a careful process of selection, would become rulers, and hereditary rule would actually have been forbidden, unless the rulers' children performed best and were better endowed with the attributes that make a person fit to rule compared with every other citizen in the polity.

Hereditary rule in this understanding is more related to oligarchy, a corrupted form of aristocracy where there is rule by a few, but not by the best. Plato, Socrates, Aristotle, Xenophon, and the Spartans considered aristocracy (the ideal form of rule by the few) to be inherently better than the ideal form of rule by the many (politeia), but they also considered the corrupted form of aristocracy (oligarchy) to be worse than the corrupted form of democracy (mob rule). This belief was rooted in the assumption that the masses could only produce average policy, while the best of men could produce the best policy, if they were indeed the best of men. Later, Polybius, in his analysis of the Roman Constitution, used the concept of aristocracy to describe his conception of a republic as a mixed form of government, along with democracy and monarchy in their conception from then, as a system of checks and balances, where each element checks the excesses of the other.

== Modern aristocracy ==
In modern times, aristocracy was usually seen as rule by a privileged group, the aristocratic class, and has since been contrasted with democracy.

== Concept ==
The concept evolved in ancient Greece in which a council of leading citizens was commonly empowered. That was contrasted with representative democracy in which a council of citizens was appointed as the "senate" of a city state or other political unit. The Greeks did not like the concept of monarchy, and as their democratic system fell, aristocracy was upheld.

Plato's concept of aristocracy envisions an ideal state governed by a philosopher-king—a ruler who possesses wisdom and a love for truth. He defines these "philosopher-kings" as individuals who "love the sight of truth." To illustrate this idea, Plato uses analogies such as a captain steering a ship and a doctor administering medicine, emphasizing that just as not everyone is naturally suited to navigation or medicine, not everyone is fit to govern. A significant portion of the Republic is then dedicated to outlining the educational system necessary to cultivate philosopher-kings.

In contrast, the 1651 book Leviathan by Thomas Hobbes describes an aristocracy as a commonwealth in which the representative of the citizens is an assembly by part only. It is a system in which only a small part of the population represents the government; "certain men distinguished from the rest."

== Differentiation ==
The corrupt form of an aristocracy is sometimes termed an "oligarchy". Socrates describes oligarchy as a system rife with corruption and instability. As the ruling elite prioritize their own wealth, they enact laws that further concentrate power and resources in their hands. This deepens economic divisions between the rich and the poor, leading to class conflict and internal strife.

== History ==
Aristocracies dominated political and economic power for most of the medieval and modern periods almost everywhere in Europe, using their wealth and land ownership to form a powerful political force. The English Civil War involved the first sustained organised effort to reduce aristocratic power in Europe.

=== 18th and 19th centuries ===
In the 18th century, the rising merchant class attempted to use money to buy into the aristocracy, with some success. However, the French Revolution in the 1790s forced many French aristocrats into exile and caused consternation and shock in the aristocratic families of neighbouring countries. After the defeat of Napoleon in 1814, some of the surviving exiles returned, but their position within French society was not recovered.

The planter class, owners of large-scale plantations where enslaved Africans produced crops to create wealth for a white elite, dominated political and economic affairs in America for over a century. The London School of Economics: "The dominant elite in the South before the Civil War were the wealthy landowners who held people in slavery, the so-called "planter class". Their influence in politics before the war can best be illustrated by highlighting that of the 15 presidents before Abraham Lincoln, eight held people as slaves while in office." While many former slaveowners kept control of their land and remained politically influential, according to C. Vann Woodward, the Civil War weakened and in some cases destroyed the planter aristocracy.

Beginning in Britain, industrialization in the 19th century brought urbanization, with wealth increasingly concentrated in the cities, which absorbed political power. However, as late as 1900, aristocrats maintained political dominance in Britain, Germany, Denmark, Sweden, Austria and Russia.

=== 20th century ===
The First World War had the effect of dramatically reducing the power of aristocrats in all major countries. In Russia, aristocrats were imprisoned and murdered by the communists. After 1900, liberal and socialist governments levied heavy taxes on landowners, spelling their loss of economic power.

=== Outside Europe ===
In the Chola dynasty, the local (village) administration included a Sabha (meaning council or assembly in Tamil), which consisted entirely of Brahmins from the Brahmadeya villages—which were considered the "elite" of the time (i.e., being the highest caste in India).

== See also ==
- Elitism – Notion that elites deserve more influence
- Kakistocracy – Government run by the least qualified
- Meritocracy – Political system in which capital is assigned on the basis of competence
- Old money – Social class of the rich
- Timocracy – Form of government, where power derives from wealth
- Technocracy – Form of government run by experts
