= Republic =

Form of government

A republic, based on the Latin phrase res publica ('public thing' or 'people's thing'), is a state in which political power rests with the public (people), typically through their representatives—in contrast to an absolute monarchy or a direct democracy. Although a republic is most often a single sovereign state, subnational state entities that have governments that are republican in nature may be referred to as republics.

As of 2017, 159 of the world's 206 sovereign states use the word "republic" as part of their official names. Not all of these are republics in the sense of having elected governments, nor is the word "republic" used in the names of all states with elected governments.

The term developed its meaning in reference to the constitution of the ancient Roman Republic after the overthrow of the kings in 509 BC. Rome continued to refer itself as a republic even after the establishment of the Empire in 27 BC. This constitution was characterized by a Senate composed of wealthy aristocrats wielding significant influence; several popular assemblies of all free citizens, possessing the power to elect magistrates from the populace and pass laws; and a series of magistracies with varying types of civil and political authority.

== Etymology ==
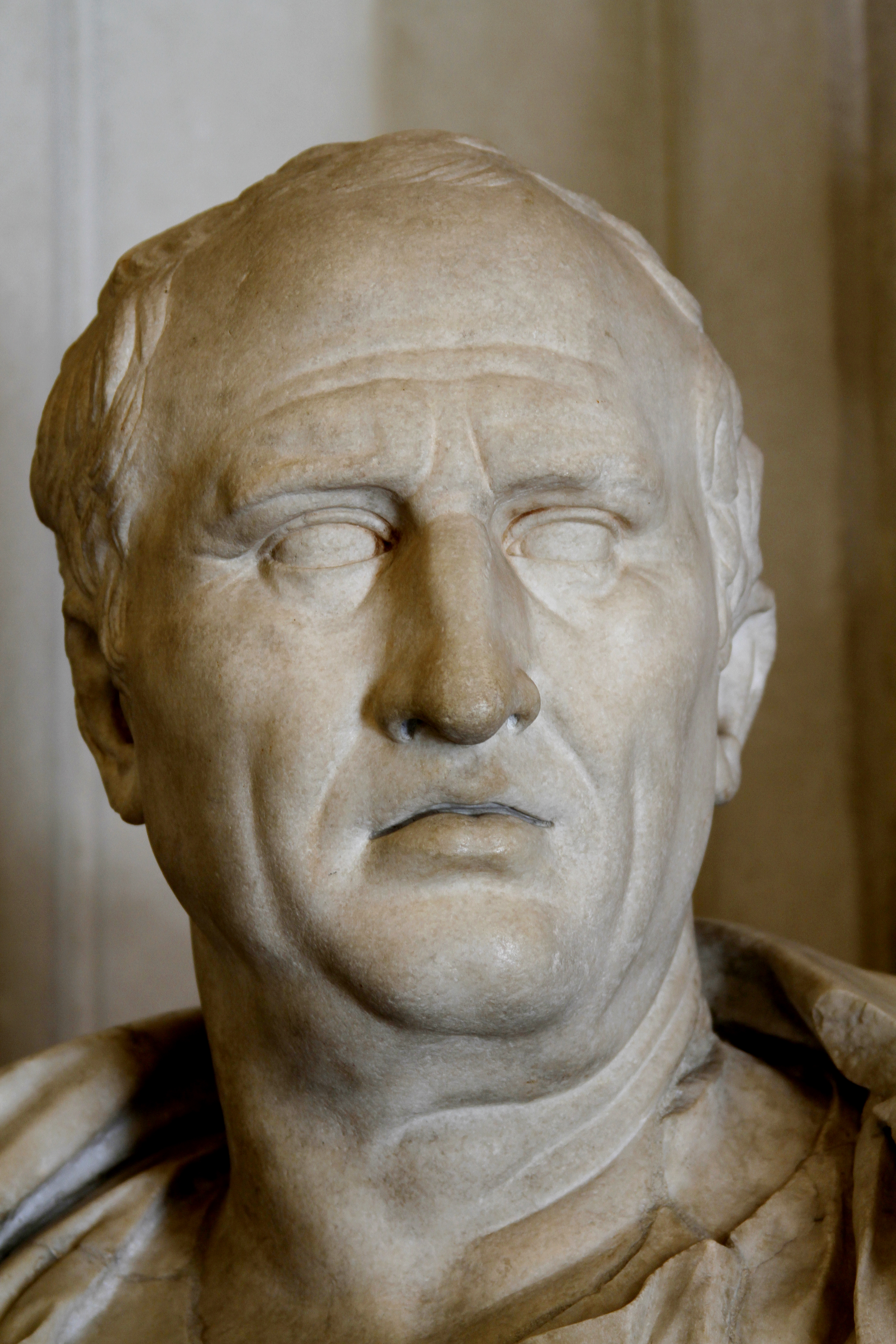
Sculpture of Cicero

The term originates from the Latin translation of Greek word politeia. Cicero, among other Latin writers, translated politeia into Latin as res publica, and it was in turn translated by Renaissance scholars as republic (or similar terms in various European languages). The term can literally be translated as 'public matter'. It was used by Roman writers to refer to the state and government, even during the period of the Roman Empire.

The term politeia can be translated as form of government, polity, or regime, and it does not necessarily imply any specific type of regime as the modern word republic sometimes does. One of Plato's major works on political philosophy, usually known in English as The Republic, was titled Politeia. However, apart from the title, modern translations are generally used. Aristotle was apparently the first classical writer to state that the term politeia can be used to refer more specifically to one type of politeia, asserting in Book III of his Politics: "When the citizens at large govern for the public good, it is called by the name common to all governments (to koinon onoma pasōn tōn politeiōn), government (politeia)". In later Latin works the term republic can also be used in a general way to refer to any regime, or to refer specifically to governments which work for the public good.

In medieval Northern Italy, a number of city states had commune or signoria based governments. In the late Middle Ages, writers such as Giovanni Villani described these states using terms such as libertas populi, a free people. The terminology changed in the 15th century as the renewed interest in the writings of Ancient Rome caused writers to prefer classical terminology. To describe non-monarchical states, writers (most importantly, Leonardo Bruni) adopted the Latin phrase res publica.

While Bruni and Machiavelli used the term to describe the states of Northern Italy, which were not monarchies, the term res publica has a set of interrelated meanings in the original Latin. In subsequent centuries, the English word commonwealth came to be used as a translation of res publica, and its use in English was comparable to how the Romans used the term res publica. Notably, during The Protectorate of Oliver Cromwell the word commonwealth was the most common term to call the new monarchless state, but the word republic was also in common use.

== History ==
While the philosophical terminology developed in classical Greece and Rome, as already noted by Aristotle there was already a long history of city states with a wide variety of constitutions, not only in Greece but also in the Middle East. After the classical period, during the Middle Ages, many free cities developed again, such as Venice.

Since the Age of Revolution the term republic has described mainly states with a written constitution and the legitimacy of its officials derives from the consent of the people rather than heredity or divine right.

=== Classical republics ===
A map of the Roman Republic in 45 BC

Ancient and modern republics differ in many ways, like the use of representative assemblies (modern) in opposition to popular (ancient) assemblies to pass legislation. Ancient republics include ancient Athens and the Roman Republic. The structure and governance of these states was different from that of any modern republic, so there is debate about the extent to which classical, medieval, and modern republics form a historical continuum. J. G. A. Pocock has argued that a distinct republican tradition stretches from the classical world to the present. Other scholars disagree. Paul Rahe, for instance, argues that the classical republics had a form of government with few links to those in any modern country.

The political philosophy of the classical republics has influenced republican thought throughout the subsequent centuries. Philosophers and politicians advocating republics, such as Machiavelli, Montesquieu, Adams, and Madison, relied heavily on classical Greek and Roman sources which described various types of regimes.

Aristotle's Politics discusses various forms of government. One form Aristotle named politeia, which consisted of a mixture of the other forms, oligarchy and democracy. He argued that this was one of the ideal forms of government. Polybius expanded on many of these ideas, again focusing on the idea of mixed government and differentiated basic forms of government between "benign" monarchy, aristocracy, and democracy, and the "malignant" tyranny, oligarchy, and ochlocracy. The most important Roman work in this tradition is Cicero's De re publica.

Over time, the classical republics became empires or were conquered by empires. Most of the Greek republics were annexed to the Macedonian Empire of Alexander. The Roman Republic expanded dramatically, conquering the other states of the Mediterranean that could be considered republics, such as Carthage. The Roman Republic itself then became the Roman Empire.

=== Other ancient republics ===
The term republic is not commonly used to refer to pre-classical city-states, especially if outside Europe and the area which was under Graeco-Roman influence. However some early states outside Europe had governments that are sometimes today considered similar to republics.

In the ancient West Asia, a number of cities of the Eastern Mediterranean achieved collective rule. Republic city-states flourished in Phoenicia along the Levantine coast starting from the 11th century BC. In ancient Phoenicia, the concept of Shophet was very similar to a Roman consul. Under Persian rule (539–332 BC), Phoenician city-states such as Tyre abolished the king system and adopted "a system of the suffetes (judges), who remained in power for short mandates of 6 years". Arwad has been cited as one of the earliest known examples of a republic, in which the people, rather than a monarch, are described as sovereign. The Israelite confederation of the era of the Judges before the United Monarchy has also been considered a type of republic. The system of government of the Igbo people in what is now Nigeria has been described as "direct and participatory democracy".

=== Indian subcontinent ===
Early republican institutions come from the independent gaṇasaṅghas—gaṇa means 'tribe' and saṅgha means 'assembly'—which may have existed as early as the 6th century BC and persisted in some areas until the 4th century AD in India. The evidence for this is scattered, however, and no pure historical source exists for that period. Diodorus, a Greek historian who wrote two centuries after the time of Alexander the Great's invasion of India (now Pakistan and northwest India) mentions, without offering any detail, that independent and democratic states existed in India. Modern scholars note the word democracy at the time of the 3rd century BC and later suffered from degradation and could mean any autonomous state, no matter how aristocratic in nature.

The Mahajanapadas were the sixteen most powerful and vast kingdoms and republics of the era; there were also a number of smaller kingdoms stretching the length and breadth of Ancient India. Among the mahajanapadas and smaller states, the Shakyas, Koliyas, Mallakas, and Licchavis followed republican government.

Key characteristics of the gaṇa seem to include a gaṇa mukhya (chief), and a deliberative assembly. The assembly met regularly. It discussed all major state decisions. At least in some states, attendance was open to all free men. This body also had full financial, administrative, and judicial authority. Other officers, who rarely receive any mention, obeyed the decisions of the assembly. Elected by the gaṇa, the chief apparently always belonged to a family of the noble class of Kshatriya Varna. The chief coordinated his activities with the assembly; in some states, he did so with a council of other nobles. The Licchavis had a primary governing body of 7,077 gaṇa mukhyas, the heads of the most important families. On the other hand, the Shakyas, Koliyas, Mallakas, and Licchavis, during the period around Gautama Buddha, had the assembly open to all men, rich and poor. Early republics or gaṇasaṅgha, such as Mallakas, centered in the city of Kusinagara, and the Vajjika (or Vṛjika) League, centered in the city of Vaishali, existed as early as the 6th century BC and persisted in some areas until the 4th century AD. The most famous clan amongst the ruling confederate clans of the Vajji Mahajanapada were the Licchavis. The Empire of Magadha included republican communities such as the community of Rajakumara. Villages had their own assemblies under their local chiefs called gramakas. Their administrations were divided into executive, judicial, and military functions.

Scholars differ over how best to describe these governments, and the vague, sporadic quality of the evidence allows for wide disagreements. Some emphasize the central role of the assemblies and thus tout them as democracies; other scholars focus on the upper-class domination of the leadership and possible control of the assembly and see an aristocracy. Despite the assembly's obvious power, it has not yet been established whether the composition and participation were truly popular. This is reflected in the Arthashastra, an ancient handbook for monarchs on how to rule efficiently. It contains a chapter on how to deal with the saṅghas, which includes injunctions on manipulating the noble leaders, yet it does not mention how to influence the mass of the citizens, indicating that the gaṇasaṅgha are more of an aristocratic republic, than democracy.

=== Icelandic Commonwealth ===
The Icelandic Commonwealth was established in 930 AD by refugees from Norway who had fled the unification of that country under King Harald Fairhair. The Commonwealth consisted of a number of clans run by chieftains, and the Althing was a combination of parliament and supreme court where disputes appealed from lower courts were settled, laws were decided, and decisions of national importance were taken. One such example was the Christianisation of Iceland in 1000, where the Althing decreed that all Icelanders must be baptized into Christianity, and forbade celebration of pagan rituals. Contrary to most states, the Icelandic Commonwealth had no official leader.

In the early 13th century, the Age of the Sturlungs, the Commonwealth began to suffer from long conflicts between warring clans. This, combined with pressure from the Norwegian king Haakon IV for the Icelanders to rejoin the Norwegian "family", led the Icelandic chieftains to accept Haakon IV as king by the signing of the Gamli sáttmáli ("Old Covenant") in 1262. This effectively brought the Commonwealth to an end. The Althing, however, is still Iceland's parliament, almost 800 years later.

=== Mercantile republics ===
Giovanni Battista Tiepolo, Neptune offers the wealth of the sea to Venice, 1748–1750. This painting is an allegory of the power of the Republic of Venice.

In Europe new republics appeared in the late Middle Ages when a number of small states embraced republican systems of government. These were generally small, but wealthy, trading states, like the Mediterranean maritime republics and the Hanseatic League, in which the merchant class had risen to prominence. Knud Haakonssen has noted that, by the Renaissance, Europe was divided with those states controlled by a landed elite being monarchies and those controlled by a commercial elite being republics.

Italy was the most densely populated area of Europe, and also one with the weakest central government. Many of the towns thus gained considerable independence and adopted commune forms of government. Completely free of feudal control, the Italian city-states expanded, gaining control of the rural hinterland. The two most powerful were the Republic of Venice and its rival the Republic of Genoa. Each were large trading ports, and further expanded by using naval power to control large parts of the Mediterranean. It was in Italy that an ideology advocating for republics first developed. Writers such as Bartholomew of Lucca, Brunetto Latini, Marsilius of Padua, and Leonardo Bruni saw the medieval city-states as heirs to the legacy of Greece and Rome.

Across Europe a wealthy merchant class developed in the important trading cities. Despite their wealth they had little power in the feudal system dominated by the rural land owners, and across Europe began to advocate for their own privileges and powers. The more centralized states, such as France and England, granted limited city charters.

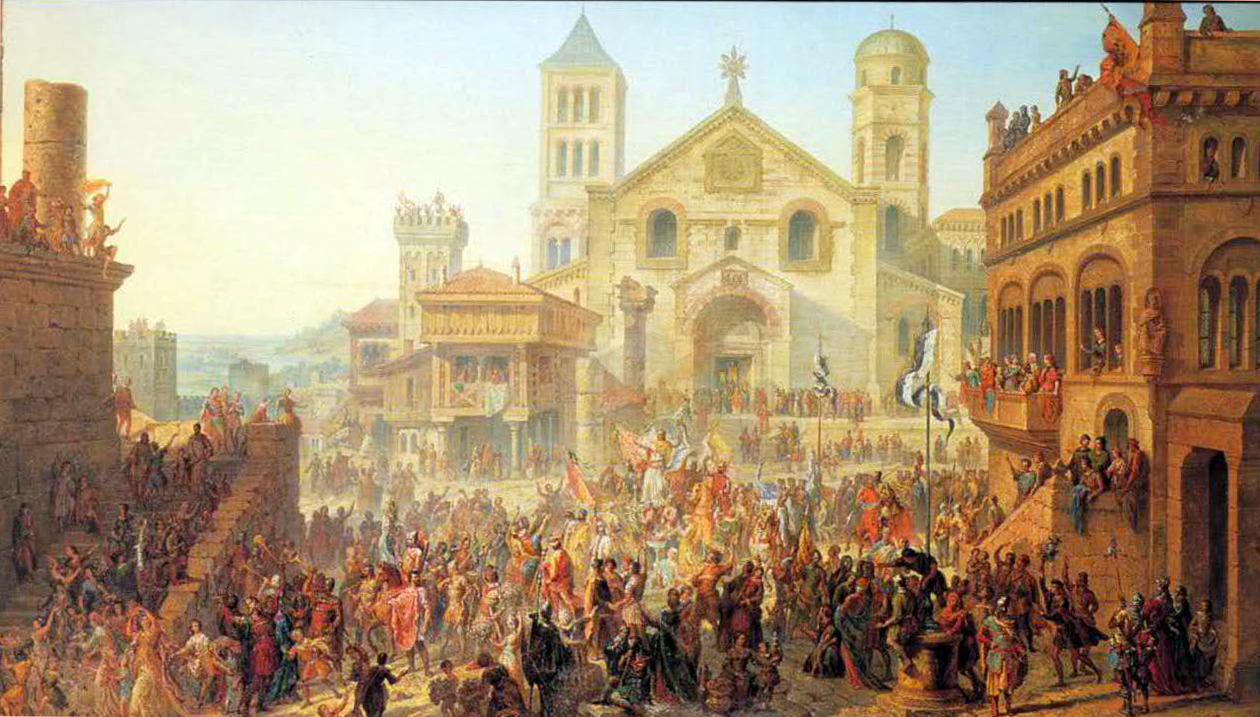
Beginning of the Republic of Metz. Election of the first Head-Alderman in 1289, by Auguste Migette. Metz was then a free imperial city of the Holy Roman Emperor.

In the more loosely governed Holy Roman Empire, 51 of the largest towns became free imperial cities. While still under the dominion of the Holy Roman Emperor most power was held locally and many adopted republican forms of government. The same rights to imperial immediacy were secured by the major trading cities of Switzerland. The towns and villages of alpine Switzerland had, courtesy of geography, also been largely excluded from central control. Unlike Italy and Germany, much of the rural area was thus not controlled by feudal barons, but by independent farmers who also used communal forms of government. When the Habsburgs tried to reassert control over the region both rural farmers and town merchants joined the rebellion. The Swiss were victorious, and the Swiss Confederacy was proclaimed, and Switzerland has retained a republican form of government to the present.

Two Russian cities with powerful merchant classes—Novgorod and Pskov—also developed republican forms of government in the 12th and 13th centuries. In the other Russian principalities, the prince remained the central political figure. The autonomies of Novgorod and Pskov were terminated by the grand princes of Moscow in 1478 and 1510, respectively, and the two cities were formally incorporated into the centralized Russian state.

Following the collapse of the Seljuk Sultanate of Rum and establishment of the Turkish Anatolian Beyliks, the Ahiler merchant fraternities established a state centered on Ankara that is sometimes compared to the Italian mercantile republics.

The dominant form of government for these early republics was control by a limited council of elite patricians. In those areas that held elections, property qualifications or guild membership limited both who could vote and who could run. In many states no direct elections were held and council members were hereditary or appointed by the existing council. This left the great majority of the population without political power, and riots and revolts by the lower classes were common. The late Middle Ages saw more than 200 such risings in the towns of the Holy Roman Empire. Similar revolts occurred in Italy, notably the Ciompi Revolt in Florence.

=== Calvinist republics ===
While the classical writers had been the primary ideological source for the republics of Italy, in Northern Europe, the Protestant Reformation would be used as justification for establishing new republics. Most important was Calvinist theology, which developed in the Swiss Confederacy, one of the largest and most powerful of the medieval republics. John Calvin did not call for the abolition of monarchy, but he advanced the doctrine that the faithful had the duty to overthrow irreligious monarchs. Advocacy for republics appeared in the writings of the Huguenots during the French Wars of Religion.

Calvinism played an important role in the republican revolts in England and the Netherlands. Like the city-states of Italy and the Hanseatic League, both were important trading centres, with a large merchant class prospering from the trade with the New World. Large parts of the population of both areas also embraced Calvinism. During the early days of the Dutch Revolt, which started in 1566, the city of Ghent declared itself a Calvinist republic (1577-1584). Later, the Dutch Republic emerged from rejection of Spanish Habsburg rule. However, the country did not adopt the republican form of government immediately: in the formal declaration of independence (Act of Abjuration, 1581), the throne of King Philip was only declared vacant, and the Dutch magistrates asked Francis, Duke of Anjou, Queen Elizabeth of England and Prince William of Orange, one after another, to replace Philip. It took until 1588 before the Estates (the Staten, the representative assembly at the time) decided to vest the sovereignty of the country in themselves.

In 1641 the English Civil War began. Spearheaded by the Puritans and funded by the merchants of London, the revolt was a success, and King Charles I was executed. In England James Harrington, Algernon Sidney, and John Milton became some of the first writers to argue for rejecting monarchy and embracing a republican form of government. The English Commonwealth was short-lived, and the monarchy was soon restored. The Dutch Republic continued in name until 1795, but by the mid-18th century the stadtholder had become a de facto monarch. Calvinists were also some of the earliest settlers of the British and Dutch colonies of North America.

=== Liberal republics ===
Liberal republics in early modern Europe

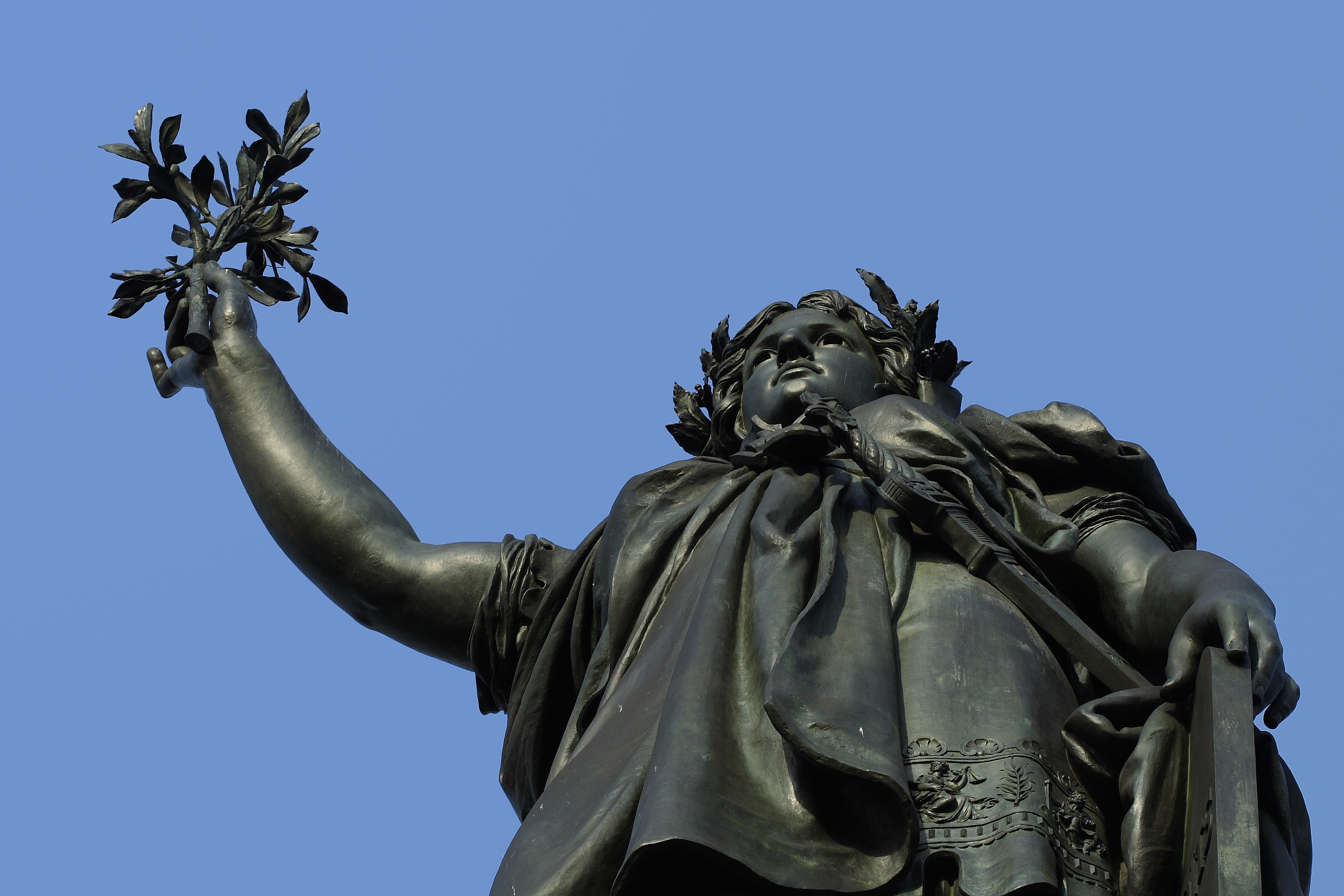
An allegory of the French Republic in Paris

Septinsular Republic flag from the early 1800s

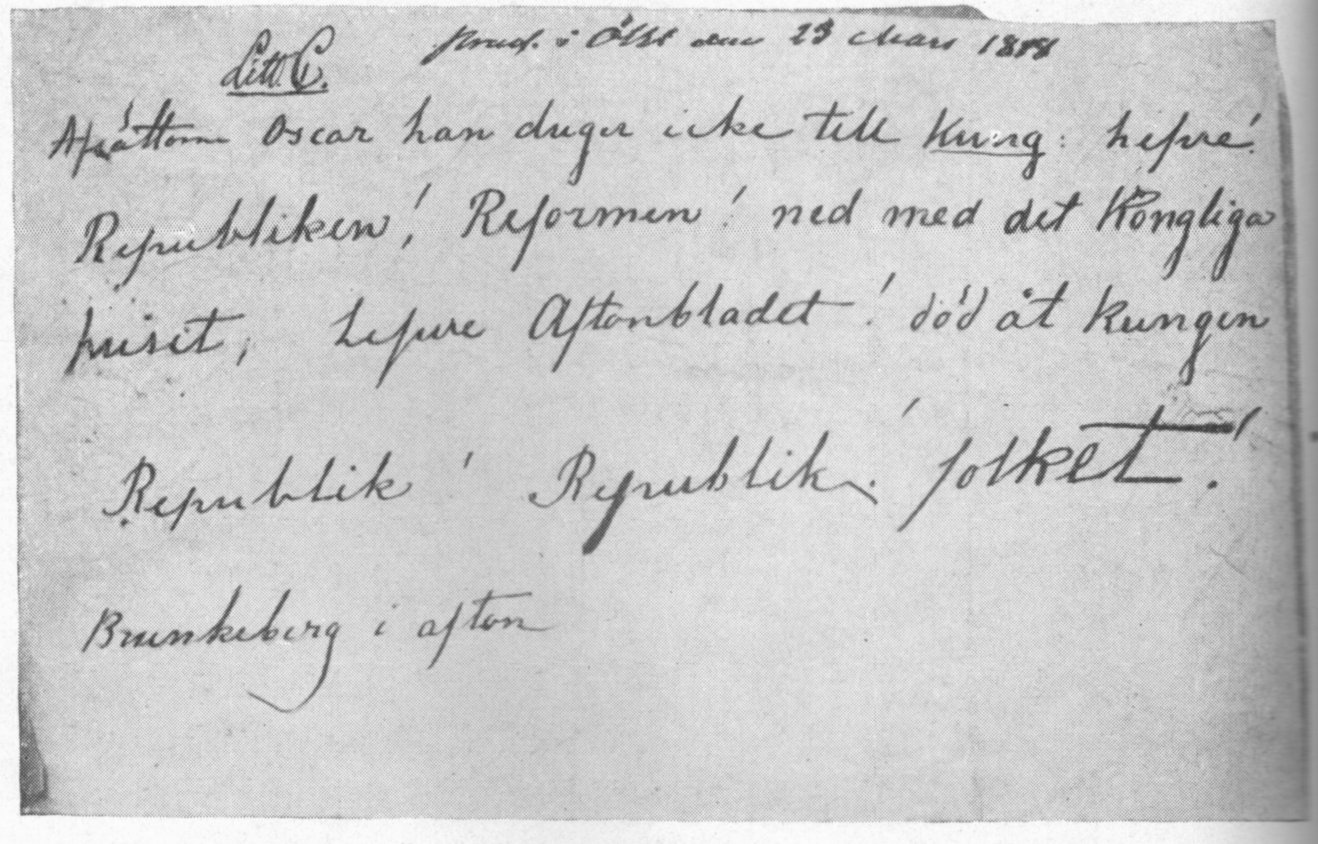
A revolutionary Republican hand-written bill from the Stockholm riots during the Revolutions of 1848, reading: "Dethrone Oscar he is not fit to be a king: Long live the Republic! The Reform! down with the Royal house, long live Aftonbladet! death to the king / Republic Republic the People. Brunkeberg this evening". The writer's identity is unknown.

Along with these initial republican revolts, early modern Europe also saw a great increase in monarchical power. The era of absolute monarchy replaced the limited and decentralized monarchies that had existed in most of the Middle Ages. It also saw a reaction against the total control of the monarch as a series of writers created the ideology known as liberalism.

Most of these Enlightenment thinkers were far more interested in ideas of constitutional monarchy than in republics. The Cromwell regime had discredited republicanism, and most thinkers felt that republics ended in either anarchy or tyranny. Thus philosophers like Voltaire opposed absolutism while at the same time being strongly pro-monarchy.

Jean-Jacques Rousseau and Montesquieu praised republics, and looked on the city-states of Greece as a model. However, both also felt that a state like France, with 20 million people, would be impossible to govern as a republic. Rousseau admired the republican experiment in Corsica (1755–1769) and described his ideal political structure of small, self-governing communes. Montesquieu felt that a city-state should ideally be a republic, but maintained that a limited monarchy was better suited to a state with a larger territory.

The American Revolution began as a rejection only of the authority of the British Parliament over the colonies, not of the monarchy. The failure of the British monarch to protect the colonies from what they considered the infringement of their rights to representative government, the monarch's branding of those requesting redress as traitors, and his support for sending combat troops to demonstrate authority resulted in widespread perception of the British monarchy as tyrannical.

With the United States Declaration of Independence the leaders of the revolt firmly rejected the monarchy and embraced republicanism. The leaders of the revolution were well-versed in the writings of the European liberal thinkers, and also in the history of the classical republics. John Adams had notably written a book on republics throughout history. In addition, the widely distributed and popularly read-aloud tract Common Sense, by Thomas Paine, succinctly and eloquently laid out the case for republican ideals and independence to the larger public. The Constitution of the United States, which went into effect in 1789, created a relatively strong federal republic to replace the relatively weak confederation under the first attempt at a national government with the Articles of Confederation and Perpetual Union ratified in 1781. The first ten amendments to the Constitution called the United States Bill of Rights, guaranteed certain natural rights fundamental to republican ideals that justified the Revolution.

The French Revolution was also not republican at its outset. Only after the Flight to Varennes removed most of the remaining sympathy for the king was a republic declared and Louis XVI sent to the guillotine. The stunning success of France in the French Revolutionary Wars saw republics spread by force of arms across much of Europe as a series of client republics were set up across the continent. The rise of Napoleon saw the end of the French First Republic and her Sister Republics, each replaced by "popular monarchies". Throughout the Napoleonic period, the victors extinguished many of the oldest republics on the continent, including the Republic of Venice, the Republic of Genoa, and the Dutch Republic. They were eventually transformed into monarchies or absorbed into neighboring monarchies.

Outside Europe, another group of republics was created as the Napoleonic Wars allowed the states of Latin America to gain their independence. Liberal ideology had only a limited impact on these new republics. The main impetus was the local European-descended Creole population in conflict with the Peninsulares—governors sent from overseas. The majority of the population in most of Latin America was of either African or Amerindian descent, and the Creole elite had little interest in giving these groups power and broad-based popular sovereignty. Simón Bolívar, both the main instigator of the revolts and one of its most important theorists, was sympathetic to liberal ideals but felt that Latin America lacked the social cohesion for such a system to function and advocated autocracy as necessary.

In Mexico, this autocracy briefly took the form of a monarchy in the First Mexican Empire. Due to the Peninsular War, the Portuguese court was relocated to Brazil in 1808. Brazil gained independence as a monarchy on September 7, 1822, and the Empire of Brazil lasted until 1889. In many other Latin American states various forms of autocratic republic existed until most were liberalized at the end of the 20th century.

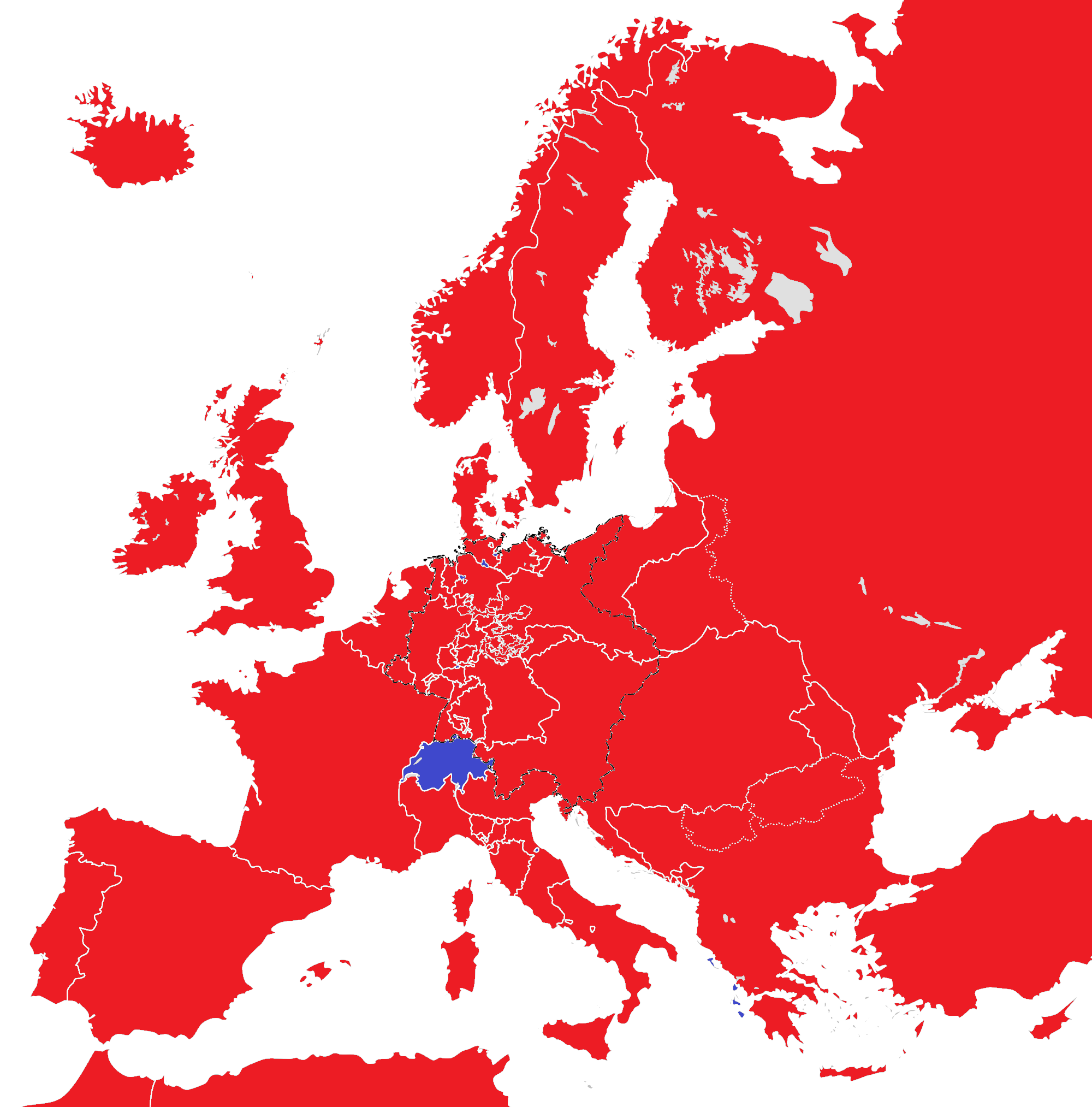
European states in 1815 Monarchies (55) Republics (9)

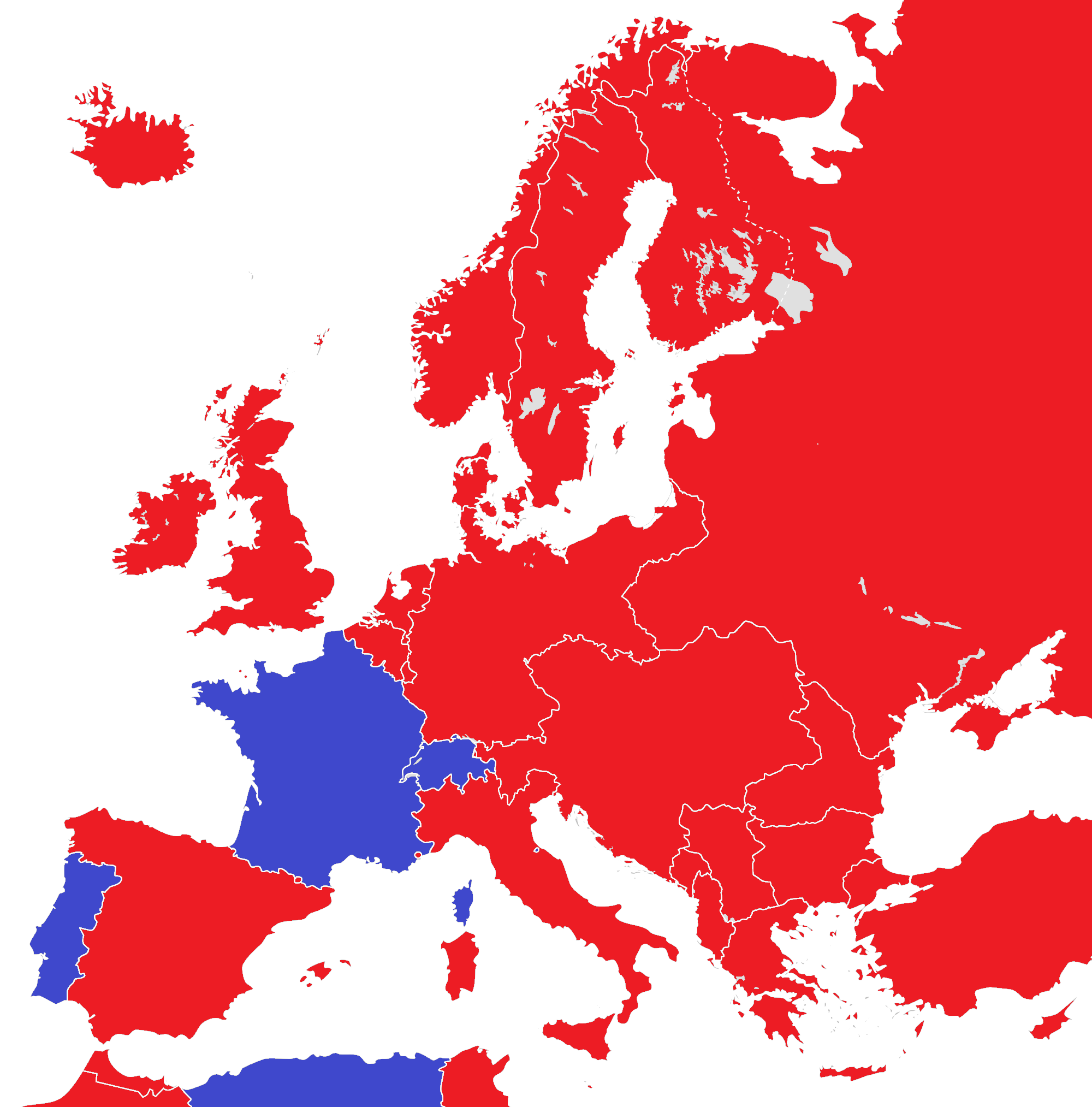
European states in 1914 Monarchies (22) Republics (4)

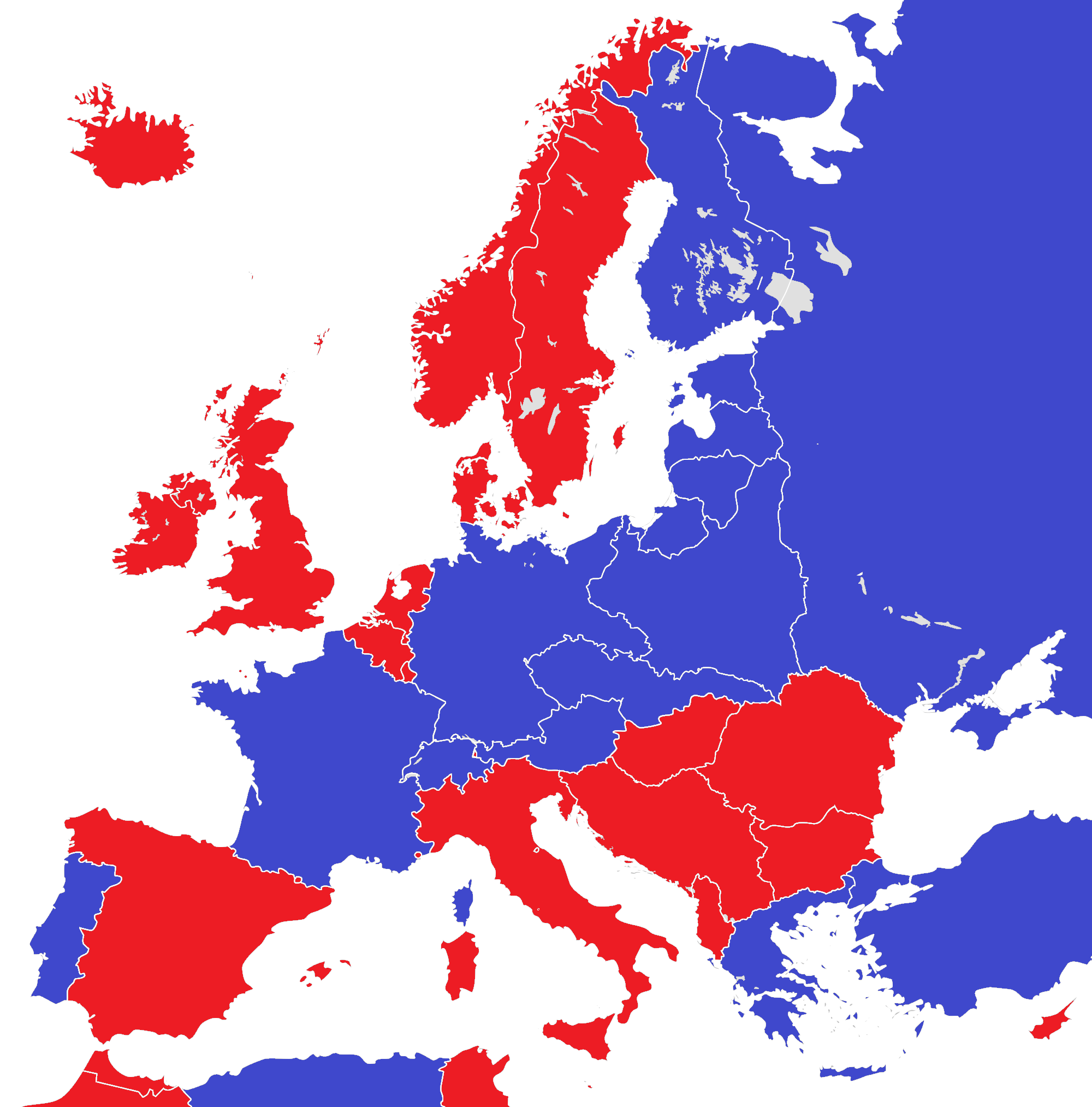
European states in 1930 Monarchies (20) Republics (15)

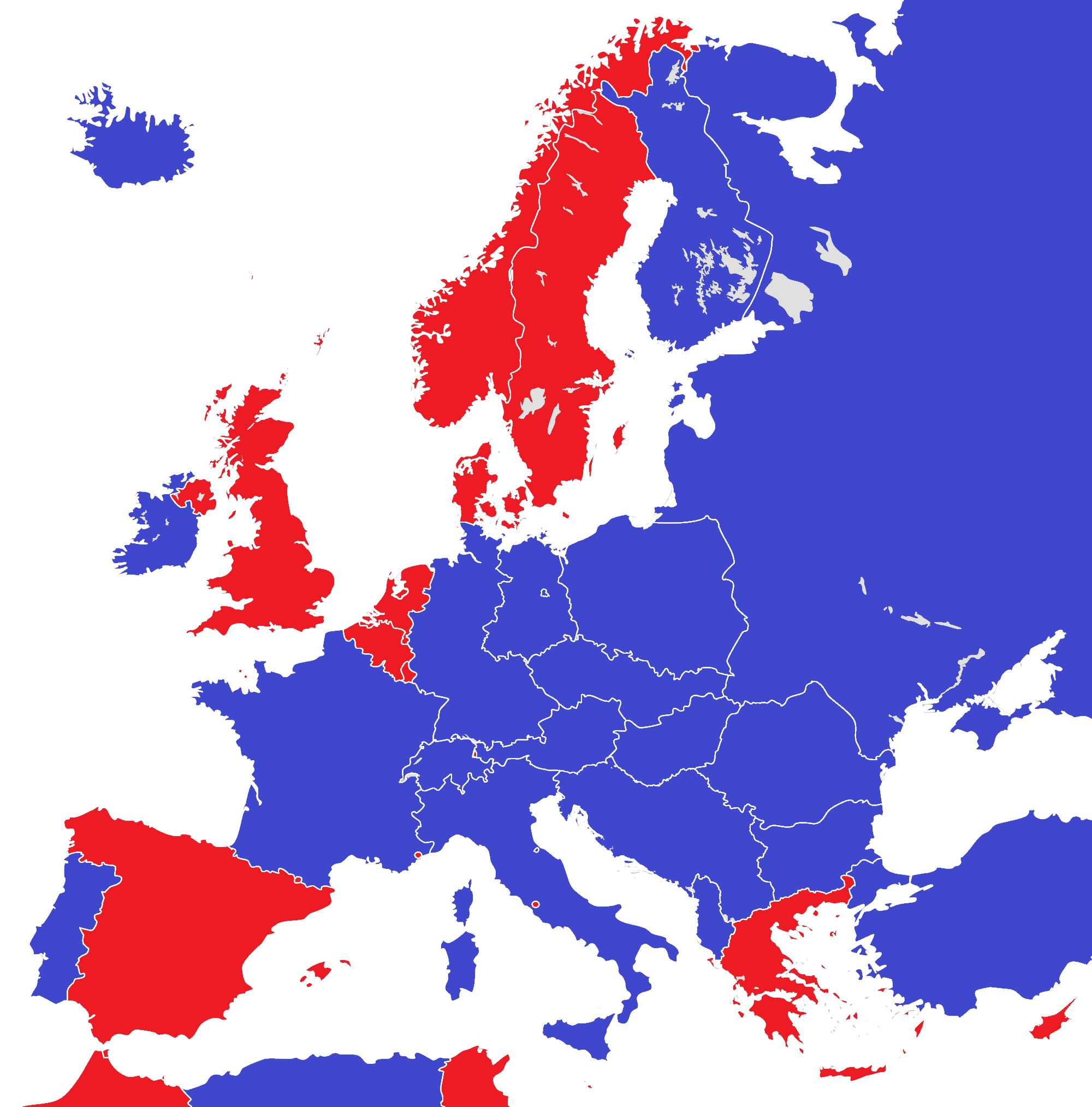
European states in 1950 Monarchies (13) Republics (21)

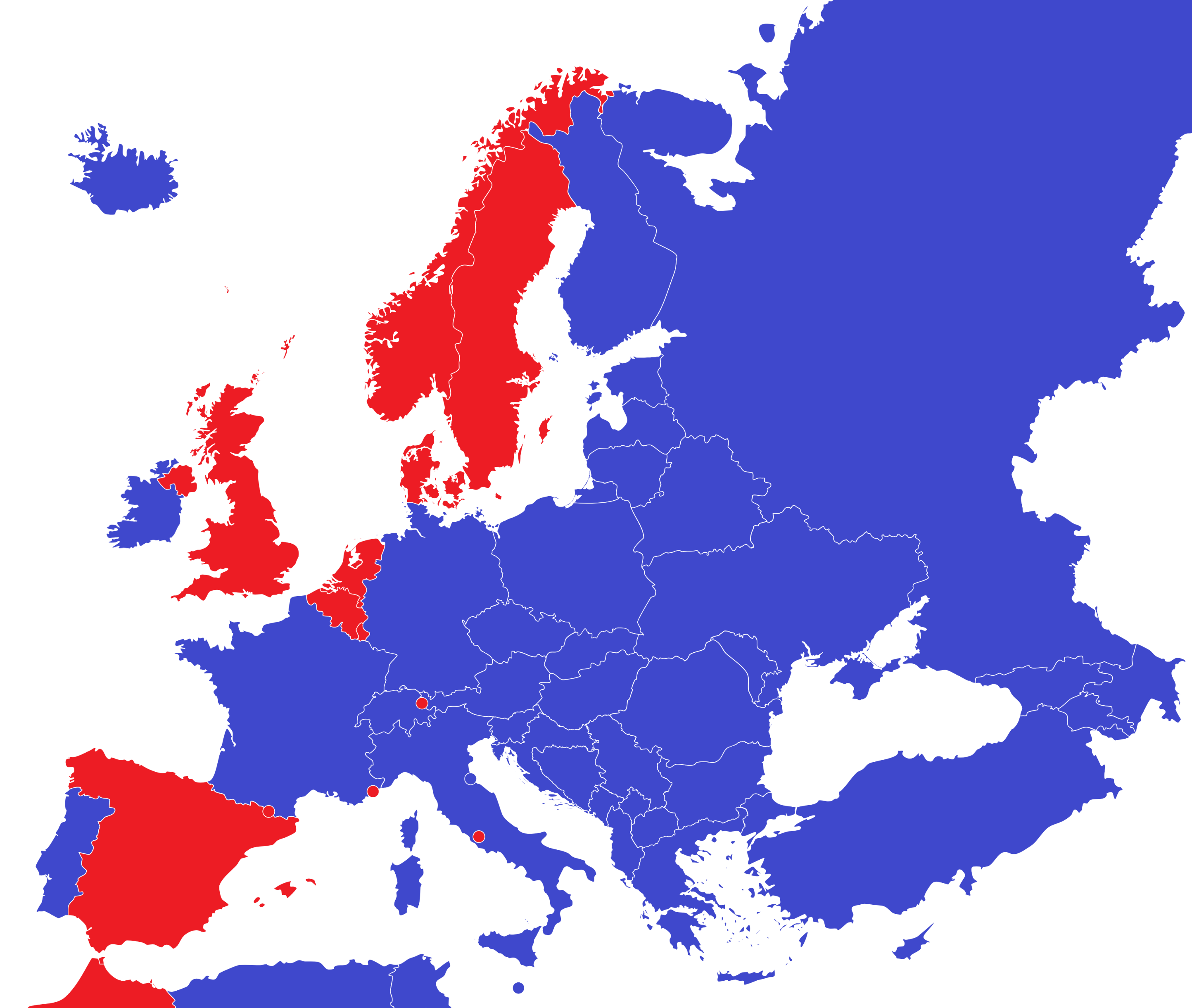
European states in 2015 Monarchies (12) Republics (35)

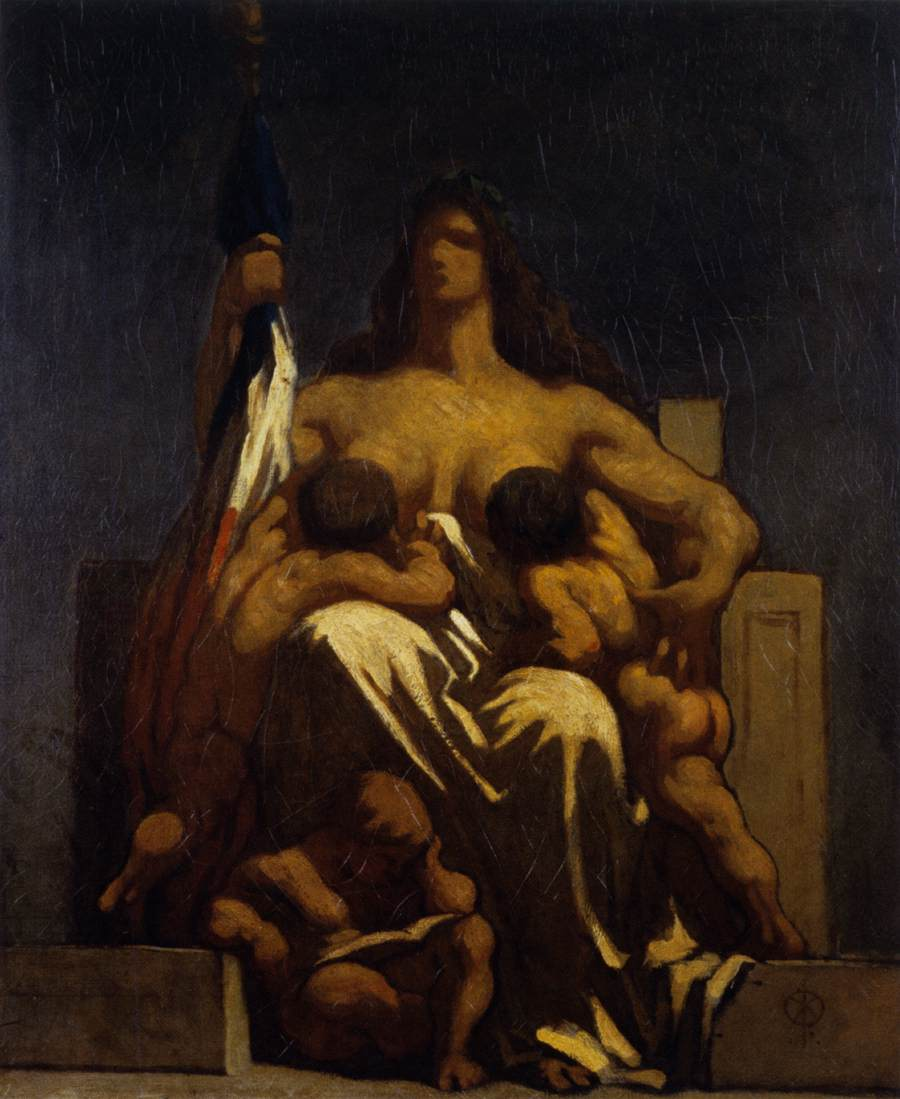
Honoré Daumier's The Republic (1848), a symbolic representation of the French Second Republic. Oil on canvas, 73 x 60 cm., The Louvre, Paris

The French Second Republic was created in 1848 but abolished by Napoleon III who proclaimed himself Emperor in 1852. The French Third Republic was established in 1870 when a civil revolutionary committee refused to accept Napoleon III's surrender during the Franco-Prussian War. Spain briefly became the First Spanish Republic in 1873–74, but the monarchy was soon restored. By the start of the 20th century, France, Switzerland and San Marino remained the only republics in Europe. This changed when, after the 1908 Lisbon Regicide, the 5 October 1910 revolution established the Portuguese Republic.

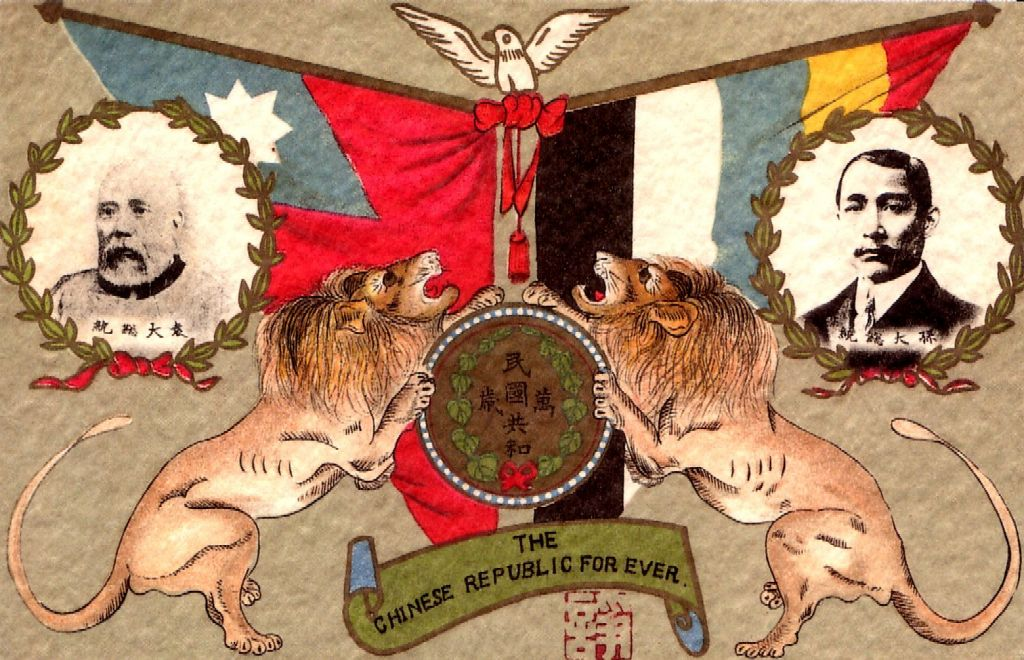
A 1920s poster that commemorates the permanent President of the Republic of China Yuan Shikai and the provisional President of the Republic Sun Yat-sen

In East Asia, China had seen considerable anti-Qing sentiment during the 19th century, and a number of protest movements developed calling for constitutional monarchy. The most important leader of these efforts was Sun Yat-sen, whose Three Principles of the People combined American, European, and Chinese ideas. Under his leadership, the Republic of China was proclaimed on January 1, 1912.

Republican ideas were spreading, especially in Asia. The United States began to have considerable influence in East Asia in the later part of the 19th century, with Protestant missionaries playing a central role. The liberal and republican writers of the West also exerted influence. These combined with native Confucian inspired political philosophy that had long argued that the populace had the right to reject unjust governments that had lost the Mandate of Heaven.

During this period, three short-lived republics were proclaimed in East Asia; the Republic of Ezo, the Republic of Formosa, and the First Philippine Republic.

Republicanism expanded significantly in the aftermath of World War I when several of the largest European empires collapsed: the Russian Empire (1917), German Empire (1918), Austro-Hungarian Empire (1918), and Ottoman Empire (1922) were all replaced by republics. New states gained independence during this turmoil, and many of these, such as Ireland, Poland, Finland and Czechoslovakia, chose republican forms of government. Following Greece's defeat in the Greco-Turkish War (1919–22), the monarchy was briefly replaced by the Second Hellenic Republic (1924–35). In 1931, the proclamation of the Second Spanish Republic (1931–39) resulted in the Spanish Civil War leading to the establishment of a Francoist regime.

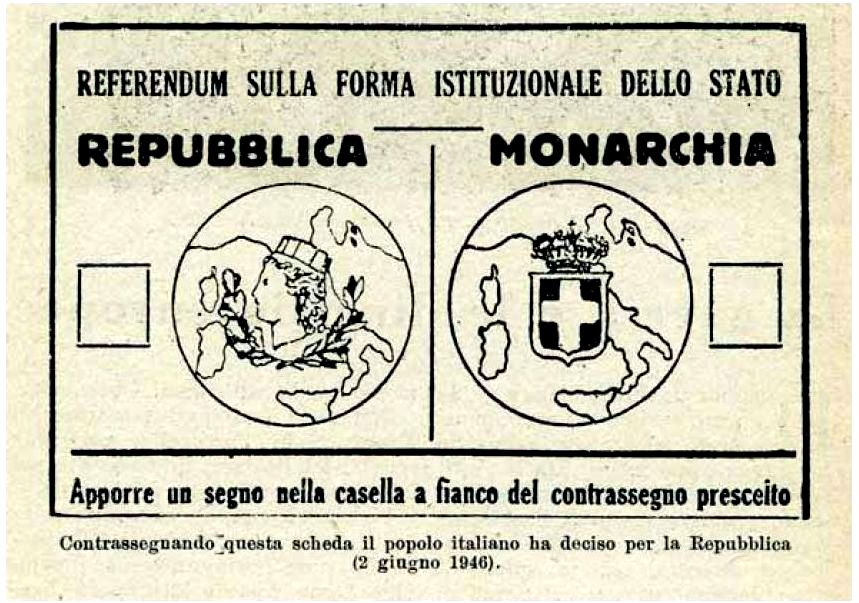
Electoral ballot of the 1946 Italian institutional referendum

The aftermath of World War II left Italy with a destroyed economy, a divided society, and anger against the monarchy for its endorsement of the Fascist regime. These frustrations contributed to a revival of the Italian republican movement. King Umberto II was pressured to call the 1946 Italian institutional referendum to decide whether Italy should remain a monarchy or become a republic. The supporters of the republic chose the effigy of the Italia turrita, the national personification of Italy, as their unitary symbol to be used in the electoral campaign and on the referendum ballot on the institutional form of the State, in contrast to the Savoy coat of arms, which represented the monarchy. On June 2, 1946 the republican side won 54.3% of the vote and Italy officially became a republic, a day celebrated since as Festa della Repubblica. Italy has a written democratic constitution, resulting from the work of a Constituent Assembly formed by the representatives of all the anti-fascist forces that contributed to the defeat of Nazi and Fascist forces during the liberation of Italy.

=== Decolonization ===
A map of the Commonwealth republics

In the years following World War II, most of the remaining European colonies gained their independence, and most became republics. The two largest colonial powers were France and the United Kingdom. Republican France encouraged the establishment of republics in its former colonies. The United Kingdom attempted to follow the model it had for its earlier settler colonies of creating independent Commonwealth realms still linked under the same monarch. While most of the settler colonies and the smaller states in the Caribbean and the Pacific retained this system, it was rejected by the newly independent countries in Africa and Asia, which revised their constitutions and became republics instead.

Britain followed a different model in the Middle East; it installed local monarchies in several colonies and mandates including Iraq, Jordan, Kuwait, Bahrain, Oman, Yemen and Libya. In subsequent decades revolutions and coups overthrew a number of monarchs and installed republics. Several monarchies remain, and the Middle East is the only part of the world where several large states are ruled by monarchs with almost complete political control.

=== Socialist republics ===
In the wake of the First World War, the Russian monarchy fell during the Russian Revolution. The Russian Provisional Government was established in its place on the lines of a liberal republic, but this was overthrown by the Bolsheviks who went on to establish the Union of Soviet Socialist Republics (USSR). This was the first republic established under Marxist ideology. Communism was wholly opposed to monarchy and became an important element of many republican movements during the 20th century. The Russian Revolution spread into Mongolia and overthrew its theocratic monarchy in 1924. In the aftermath of the Second World War, the communists gradually gained control of Romania, Bulgaria, Yugoslavia, Hungary and Albania, ensuring that the states were reestablished as socialist republics rather than monarchies.

Communism also intermingled with other ideologies. It was embraced by many national liberation movements during decolonization. In Vietnam, communist republicans pushed aside the Nguyễn dynasty, and monarchies in neighbouring Laos and Cambodia were overthrown by communist movements in the 1970s. Arab socialism contributed to a series of revolts and coups that saw the monarchies of Egypt, Iraq, Libya, and Yemen ousted. In Africa, Marxism–Leninism and African socialism led to the end of monarchy and the proclamation of republics in states such as Burundi and Ethiopia.

== Constitution ==
A republic does not necessarily have a constitution but is often constitutional in the sense of constitutionalism, meaning that it is constituted by a set of institutions which provide a separation of powers. The term constitutional republic is a way to highlight an emphasis on the separation of powers in a given republic, as with constitutional monarchy or absolute monarchy highlighting the absolute autocratic character of a monarchy.

== Head of state ==
=== Structure ===
Official name contains the word Republic. Official name does not contain the word Republic but nation is still a Republic.

With no monarch, most modern republics use the title president for the head of state. Originally used to refer to the presiding officer of a committee or governing body in Great Britain the usage was also applied to political leaders, including the leaders of some of the Thirteen Colonies (originally Virginia in 1608); in full, the "President of the Council". The first republic to adopt the title was the United States of America. Keeping its usage as the head of a committee the President of the Continental Congress was the leader of the original congress. When the new constitution was written the title of President of the United States was conferred on the head of the new executive branch.

If the head of state of a republic is also the head of government, this is called a presidential system. There are a number of forms of presidential government. A full-presidential system has a president with substantial authority and a central political role.

In other states the legislature is dominant and the presidential role is almost purely ceremonial and apolitical, such as in Germany, Italy, India, and Trinidad and Tobago. These states are parliamentary republics and operate similarly to constitutional monarchies with parliamentary systems where the power of the monarch is also greatly circumscribed. In parliamentary systems the head of government, most often titled prime minister, exercises the most real political power. Semi-presidential systems have a president as an active head of state with important powers, but they also have a prime minister as a head of government with important powers.

The rules for appointing the president and the leader of the government, in some republics permit the appointment of a president and a prime minister who have opposing political convictions: in France, when the members of the ruling cabinet and the president come from opposing political factions, this situation is called cohabitation.

In some countries, like Bosnia and Herzegovina, San Marino, and Switzerland, the head of state is not a single person but a committee (council) of several persons holding that office. The Roman Republic had two consuls, elected for a one-year term by the comitia centuriata, consisting of all adult, freeborn males who could prove citizenship.

=== Elections ===
In democracies, presidents are elected, directly or indirectly (through elector-representatives) by the people. Indirect elections is proper of parliamentary systems with the United States being a notable exception, in that country, the president is officially elected by an electoral college, chosen by the States.

All U.S. States have chosen electors by popular election since 1832. In the opinion of some, direct election confers legitimacy upon the president and gives the office much of its political power.

However, this concept of legitimacy differs from that expressed in the United States Constitution which established the legitimacy of the United States president as resulting from the signing of the Constitution by nine states.

The framers of the Constitution expected the electoral college would avoid people to vote on president directly but passing that function to a more calm assembly, thus avoiding "tumult" In reality since the advent of current party system, electors only vote to the candidate their constituents have predefined, those who don't are deemed "unloyal" and can face legal problems, making the USA presidential election, de facto, a direct election, but one with weighted voting in favor of the smallest states.

In states with a parliamentary system, the president is usually elected by the parliament. This indirect election subordinates the president to the parliament, and also gives the president limited legitimacy and turns most presidential powers into reserve powers that can only be exercised under rare circumstances. There are exceptions where elected presidents have only ceremonial powers, such as in Ireland.

=== Ambiguities ===
The distinction between a republic and a monarchy is not always clear. The constitutional monarchies of the former British Empire and Western Europe today have almost all real political power vested in the elected representatives, with the monarchs only holding either theoretical powers, no powers or rarely used reserve powers. Real legitimacy for political decisions comes from the elected representatives and is derived from the will of the people. While hereditary monarchies remain in place, political power is derived from the people as in a republic. These states are thus sometimes referred to as crowned republics.

Terms such as "liberal republic" are also used to describe all of the modern liberal democracies.

There are also self-proclaimed republics that act similarly to absolute monarchies with absolute power vested in the leader and passed down from father to son. North Korea and the former Ba'athist Syria are two notable examples where a son has inherited political control. Neither of these states are or were officially monarchies. There is no constitutional requirement that power be passed down within one family, but it has occurred in practice.

There are also elective monarchies where ultimate power is vested in a monarch, but the monarch is chosen by some manner of election. A current example of such a state is Malaysia where the Yang di-Pertuan Agong is elected every five years by the Conference of Rulers composed of the nine hereditary rulers of the Malay states, and the Vatican City-State, where the pope is selected by cardinal-electors, currently all cardinals under the age of 80. While rare today, elective monarchs were common in the past. The Holy Roman Empire is an important example, where each new emperor was chosen by a group of electors. Islamic states also rarely employed primogeniture, instead relying on various forms of election to choose a monarch's successor.

The Polish–Lithuanian Commonwealth had an elective monarchy, with a wide suffrage of some 500,000 nobles. The system, known as the Golden Liberty, had developed as a method for powerful landowners to control the crown. The proponents of this system looked to classical examples, and the writings of the Italian Renaissance, and called their elective monarchy a rzeczpospolita, based on res publica.

== Sub-national republics ==
The de jure republics of Russia, which were created to give more autonomy to the country's ethnic minorities

In general being a republic also implies sovereignty as for the state to be ruled by the people it cannot be controlled by a foreign power. There are important exceptions to this, for example, republics in the Soviet Union were member states which had to meet three criteria to be named republics:

1. be on the periphery of the Soviet Union so as to be able to take advantage of their theoretical right to secede;
2. be economically strong enough to be self-sufficient upon secession; and
3. be named after at least one million people of the ethnic group which should make up the majority population of said republic.

It is sometimes argued that the former Soviet Union was also a supra-national republic, based on the claim that the member states were different nation states.

The Socialist Federal Republic of Yugoslavia was a federal entity composed of six republics (Socialist Republic of Bosnia and Herzegovina, Croatia, Macedonia, Montenegro, Serbia, and Slovenia). Each republic had its parliament, government, institute of citizenship, constitution, etc., but certain functions were delegated to the federation (army, monetary matters). Each republic also had a right of self-determination according to the conclusions of the second session of the AVNOJ and according to the federal constitution.

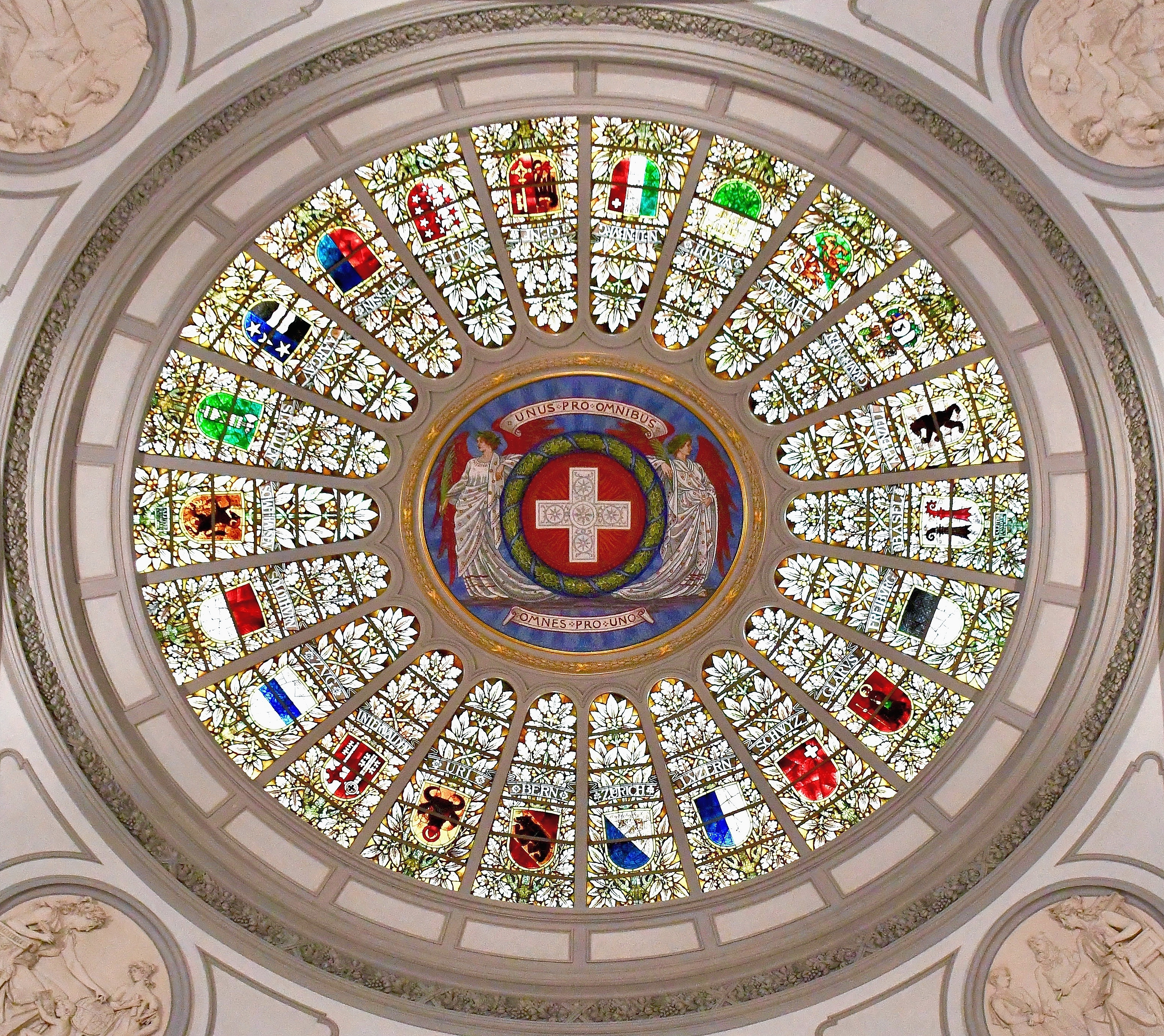
The Swiss cantons displayed on the cupola of the Federal Palace

In Switzerland, all cantons can be considered to have a republican form of government, with constitutions, legislatures, executives and courts; many of them being originally sovereign states. As a consequence, several Romance-speaking cantons are still officially referred to as republics, reflecting their history and will of independence within the Swiss Confederation. Notable examples are the Republic and Canton of Geneva and the Republic and Canton of Ticino.

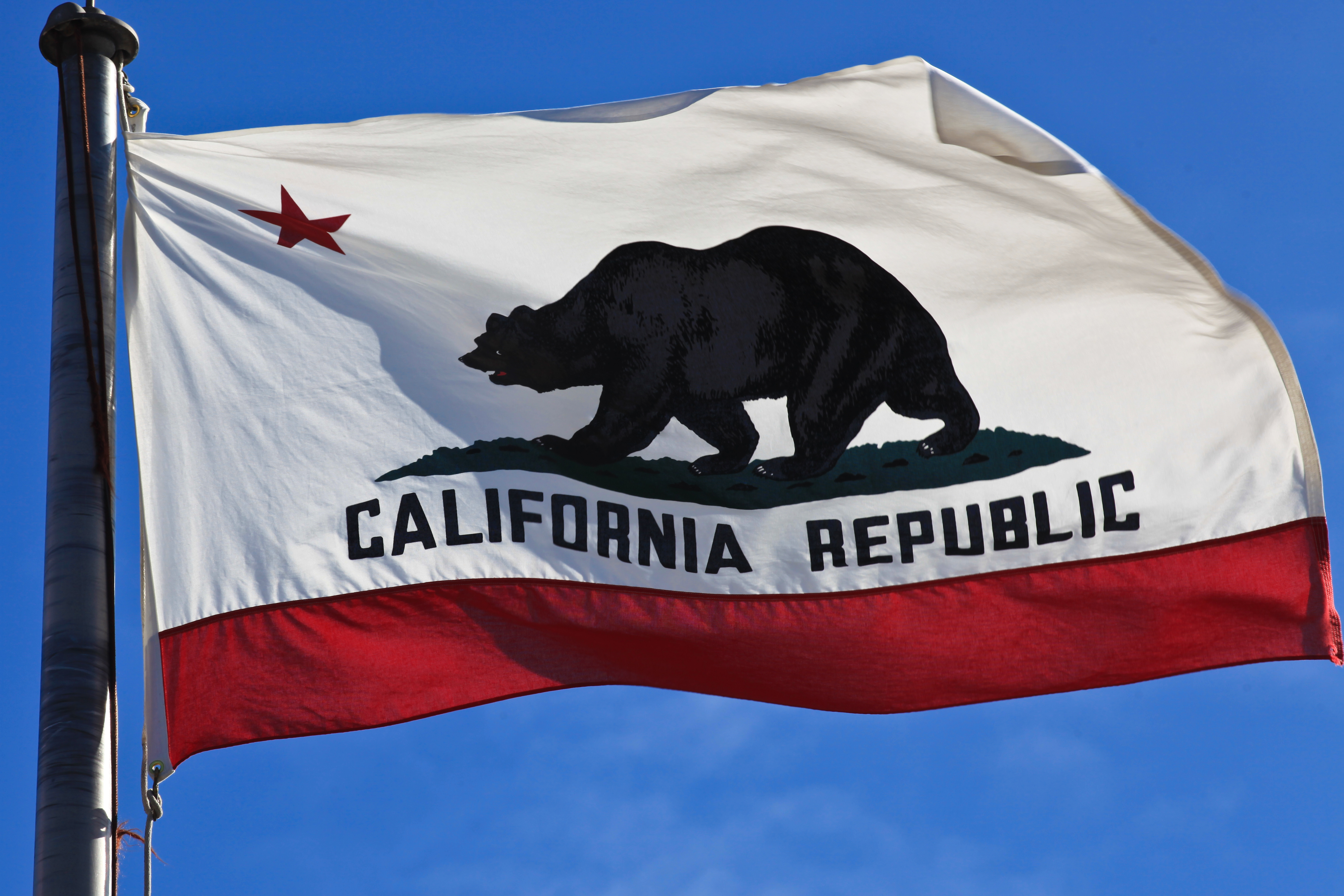
Flag of the US state of California, a sub-national entity.

States of the United States are required, like the federal government, to be republican in form, with final authority resting with the people. This was required because the states were intended to create and enforce most domestic laws, with the exception of areas delegated to the federal government and prohibited to the states. The founders of the country intended most domestic laws to be handled by the states. Requiring the states to be a republic in form was seen as protecting the citizens' rights and preventing a state from becoming a dictatorship or monarchy, and reflected unwillingness on the part of the original 13 states (all independent republics) to unite with other states that were not republics. Additionally, this requirement ensured that only other republics could join the union.

In the example of the United States, the original 13 British colonies became independent states after the American Revolution, each having a republican form of government. These independent states initially formed a loose confederation called the United States and then later formed the current United States by ratifying the current U.S. Constitution, creating a union that was a republic. Any state joining the union later was also required to be a republic.

== Other meanings ==
=== Original meaning ===
Before the 17th century, the term "republic" could be used to refer to states of any form of government as long as it was not a tyrannical regime. French philosopher Jean Bodin's definition of the republic was "the rightly ordered government of a number of families, and of those things which are their common concern, by a sovereign power." Oligarchies and monarchies could also be included as they were also organised toward "public" shared interests. In medieval texts, "republic" was used to refer to the body of shared interest with the king at its head. For instance, the Holy Roman Empire was also known as the Sancta Respublica Romana, the Holy Roman Republic. The Byzantine Empire also continued calling itself the Roman Republic as the Byzantines did not regard monarchy as a contradiction to republicanism. Instead, republics were defined as any state based on popular sovereignty and whose institutions were based on shared values.

=== Democracy vs. republic debate ===
In a republic, power is held by the people or a fraction of it, and not by a single person, with the head of state being elected directly or indirectly by the entity (like the people at large or nobility) which holds power. In a democratic state, power is necessarily wielded by the people of the state either directly, as in direct democracy or indirectly as in representative democracy. As such, they aren't incompatible concepts; see democratic republic.

Despite the classical definition including both democracies and aristocracies, in the late 18th century a tendency started on revolutionary circles (like the Jacobins or the Jeffersonians) to associate republic specifically with democracy, to the exclusion of aristocracy, as such both Jefferson and Robespierre considered direct democracy the purest form of republicanism. A variation of this argument was James Madison's version, who identified republic with the rule of the majority, directly or by representatives, replacing the classical duality between aristocracy and democracy with one between representative governments and democracies, as in specific texts (like Federalist No. 10 or Federalist No. 39) he even argues only representative governments were republics, excluding totally the ancient democracies.

Founders like John Adams opposed the new definitions of the Jeffersonians and similar circles, and kept the classical definition, meaning government where sovereignty is in more than one person, thus taking the form either of democracy or aristocracy or its mixture. To them, the state and national constitutions weren't "popular governments" but governments balancing the people and aristocracy giving a house in legislature to each.

The term democracy is sometimes used interchangeably with the term republic, while others have made sharp distinctions between the two. "Montesquieu, founder of the modern constitutional wrote on The Spirit of the Laws of 1748 'That a republican government is that in which the body or only a part of the people is possessed of the supreme power (...) When the body of the people is possessed of the supreme power, this is called a democracy. When the supreme power is lodged in the hands of a part of the people, it is then an aristocracy.' and repeated the insight that Aristotle had expressed two millennia earlier, 'Voting by lot is in the nature of democracy; voting by choice is in the nature of aristocracy.'" Additional critics of elections include Rousseau, Robespierre, and Marat, who said of the new French Republic, "What use is it to us, that we have broken the aristocracy of the nobles, if that is replaced by the aristocracy of the rich?"

=== Political philosophy ===
The use of republic as a specific form of government originated from the writers of the Renaissance, meaning a state which isn't a monarchy. These writers also wrote important prescriptive works describing how such governments should function. These ideas of how a government and society should be structured is the basis for an ideology known as classical republicanism or civic humanism. This ideology is based on the Roman Republic and the city states of Ancient Greece and focuses on ideals such as civic virtue, rule of law and mixed government.

This understanding of a republic as a form of government distinct from a liberal democracy is one of the main theses of the Cambridge School of historical analysis. This grew out of the work of J. G. A. Pocock who in 1975 argued that a series of scholars had expressed a consistent set of republican ideals. These writers included Machiavelli, Milton, Montesquieu and the founders of the United States of America.

Pocock argued that this was an ideology with a history and principles distinct from liberalism. These ideas were embraced by a number of different writers, including Quentin Skinner, Philip Pettit and Cass Sunstein. These subsequent writers have further explored the history of the idea, and also outlined how a modern republic should function.

=== United States ===
A distinct set of definitions of the term "republic" evolved in the United States, where the term is often equated with "representative democracy". This narrower understanding of the term was originally developed by James Madison and notably employed in Federalist Paper No. 10. This meaning was widely adopted early in the history of the United States, including in Noah Webster's dictionary of 1828. It was a novel meaning to the term; representative democracy was not an idea mentioned by Machiavelli and did not exist in the classical republics. There is also evidence that contemporaries of Madison considered the meaning of "republic" to reflect the broader definition found elsewhere, as is the case with a quotation of Benjamin Franklin taken from the notes of James McHenry where the question is put forth, "a Republic or a Monarchy?".

The term republic does not appear in the Declaration of Independence, but it does appear in Article IV of the Constitution, which "guarantee[s] to every State in this Union a Republican form of Government." What exactly the writers of the constitution felt this should mean is uncertain. The Supreme Court, in Luther v. Borden (1849), declared that the definition of republic was a "political question" in which it would not intervene. In two later cases, it did establish a basic definition. In United States v. Cruikshank (1875), the court ruled that the "equal rights of citizens" were inherent to the idea of a republic.

However, the term republic is not synonymous with the republican form. The republican form is defined as one in which the powers of sovereignty are vested in the people and are exercised by the people, either directly, or through representatives chosen by the people, to whom those powers are specially delegated.

Beyond these basic definitions, the word republic has a number of other connotations. W. Paul Adams observes that republic is most often used in the United States as a synonym for "state" or "government", but with more positive connotations than either of those terms. Republicanism is often referred to as the founding ideology of the United States. Traditionally scholars believed this American republicanism was a derivation of the classical liberal ideologies of John Locke and others developed in Europe.

In the 1960s and 1970s, Bernard Bailyn began to argue that republicanism was just as, or even more important than liberalism in the creation of the United States. This issue is still much disputed and scholars like Isaac Kramnick completely reject this view.

== See also ==
- Free state
- Primus inter pares
- List of republics
- Index: Republics
- Guarantee Clause of the U.S. Constitution
