= Politeia =

Ancient Greek word used in political thought

Politeia (πολιτεία) is an Ancient Greek word used in Greek political thought, especially that of Plato and Aristotle. Derived from the word polis ("city-state"), it has a range of meanings from "the rights of citizens" to a "form of government" to "commonwealth".

== English translations of the Greek word ==
According to Liddell and Scott's Greek-English Lexicon a meaning of politeia is "the conditions and rights of the citizen, or citizenship", analogous to the Latin civitas.

Politeia, in Greek means the community of citizens in a city / state. It should not be confused with "regime" that is meant by politeuma or "Status quo" that is meant by kathestos. Politeuma is the word describing the political situation of the community of citizens in a city/state, and kathestos means also the general situation of an object, an agreement, or something else.

Politeia is derived from both the root word polis meaning "city" or "state", and from the verb politeuomai that means "I am living as an active citizen of the polis".

People living in a Greek city/state were not necessarily citizens. A person that was ostracized from the active matrix of the city was an example of such. Another example was people who lived in the city but were not active citizens who had a say in the political processes of the community. Women, slaves and others who Greek men deemed unworthy were not in the active matrix of the political formations of that city state, making them not-citizens, so not part of politeia.

In the works of ancient Greek philosophers, the principal meaning of politeia appears to be: "how a polis is run; constitution". A politeia differs from modern written constitutions in two respects: first, not all Greek states put their laws in writing; more importantly, the Greeks did not normally distinguish between ordinary and constitutional legislation. If a certain body had the power to change the laws, it had the power to change the laws controlling its own power and membership—even to abolish itself and set up a new governing body.

The phrases system of government, state organisation, form of government, and, more recently, régime have also been used to translate politeia. Régime has drawbacks: it is ambiguous where politeia is not. It has a negative tone in English, which politeia does not in Greek. It is also a loan-word; and in that regard, has no advantage over simply adopting politeia itself.

Some translators thus use a different term for this second meaning of politeia. Most common is the vague term polity. Specific translations of this second meaning as constitutional democracy or republic are at least anachronistic, and in most instances contentious and/or inaccurate. Some translators feel it is incorrect to translate the same word in different ways, arguing that the ambiguity must have been deliberate and that it is impossible to always know which way the word should be rendered.

In the Greek New Testament politeia is translated as "commonwealth" or "freedom" in Ephesians 2:12 and Acts 22:28.

== In the work of the authors of antiquity ==
=== Plato and Cicero ===
Politeia is the original title of the book by Plato now commonly known in English as Republic. Cicero translated politeia as res publica (see also: De re publica), from which the modern word republic comes. Note that the meanings the ancient Romans attached to res publica were also multiple and only partially overlapping with the Greek politeia, and further that few of the multiple meanings of politeia or res publica are much of an equivalent to republic as it is understood in modern political science.

=== Aristotle ===
In the Constitution of the Athenians (Athenaion Politeia), Aristotle uses politeia for eleven states of the Athenian government up to his own time, from the absolute monarchy of Ionia and the tyranny of the Thirty to the democratic Assembly and selection by lot of Pericles's time and his own. He may have added that the absolute monarchy of Ion was "less political" than that of Theseus or the later constitutions, but the text is doubtful.

In his Politics, Aristotle clearly uses politeia both as above and also in a more restricted sense. Exactly what this sense is, and whether Aristotle is using it in a consistent manner, have both been long debated. By careful choice of quotation (a comprehensive list of quotations along with their respective cross-references is found in), all of the following can be defended:

- A specific form of government. Aristotle classified constitutions on two grounds: how many citizens had a voice in making the laws; and whether they did so considering the good of all citizens, or only their own. Along with monarchy and aristocracy, politeia is one of the three virtuous forms of government. While monarchy is the rule by the single most virtuous one, and aristocracy is the rule by the several most virtuous few, politeia is the rule by the multitude of virtuous citizens.
- A constitution that does not fit into this sixfold classification, because it has features of more than one of them: the constitutions of Carthage, Sparta, and [at least one of the cities of] Crete.
- A constitution which mixes oligarchy and democracy (terms which, as used by Aristotle, refer to vicious types of constitutions).
- A constitution in which the hoplites governed. This is more restrictive than the Athens of Aristotle's time. Athens was a naval power, and many citizens were allowed to vote, and served the state well in war, who could not afford massive metal armor.

In Book III of his Politics (1279a), Aristotle seems to indicate that, in principle, politeia refers generically to any form of government or constitution, although he uses the word also to call a particular form of government: "When the citizens at large govern for the public good, it is called by the name common to all governments (politeion), government (politeia)."

Why Aristotle uses the same term to refer to at least two distinct ideas has confused readers for millennia. For instance, later Aristotle refers to the ideal politeia as one using a mixed government. But it is uncertain whether he is referring to governments in general or to a specific form.

In the New Testament politeia refers both the Greek World as well as to the nation of Israel. Strong's Concordance defines the term as: Signifies (a) "the relation in which a citizen stands to the state, the condition of a citizen, citizenship", Acts 22:28, "with a great sum obtained I this citizenship" (KJV, "freedom"). While Paul's "citizenship" of Tarsus was not of advantage outside that city, yet his Roman "citizenship" availed throughout the Roman Empire and, besides private rights, included (1) exemption from all degrading punishments; (2) a right of appeal to the emperor after a sentence; (3) a right to be sent to Rome for trial before the emperor if charged with a capital offense. Paul's father might have obtained "citizenship" (1) by manumission; (2) as a reward of merit; (3) by purchase; the contrast implied in Acts 22:28 is perhaps against the last mentioned; (b) "a civil polity, the condition of a state, a commonwealth", said of Israel, Ephesians 2:12.

=== Diogenes of Sinope ===
Diogenes of Sinope wrote a work called Politeia (often translated as Republic) which presented a utopian vision of a Cynic society. It was a parody of other philosophers' serious political works, like Plato's, and served as a serio-comic statement of Cynic positions. Diogenes also wrote tragedies, though some of these works are now thought to have been written by his disciples

== In the Byzantine Empire ==
The Byzantine use of politeia was largely a continuation of the idea of the Res Publica in the earlier Roman Empire. It could also be interpreted as a Greek equivalent to the Latin phrase. It referred primarily to Byzantine society at large as a group with a shared identity, interests, and government. Over time, the word took on a distinctly religious aspect in meaning as well, as Byzantine identity came to be more closely connected to Christianity. The Byzantine politeia was something which the emperor served and derived legitimacy from the approval of. Contrary to the Latin 'Res Publica's' association with the modern word republic, it was not a particular form of government, or a government at all, but the people bound together by the state which served them. If an aspect of the state, in most cases meaning the emperor, failed to align with the politeia's interests, it often resulted in revolt or deposition.
