= Rzeczpospolita =

Official name of Poland

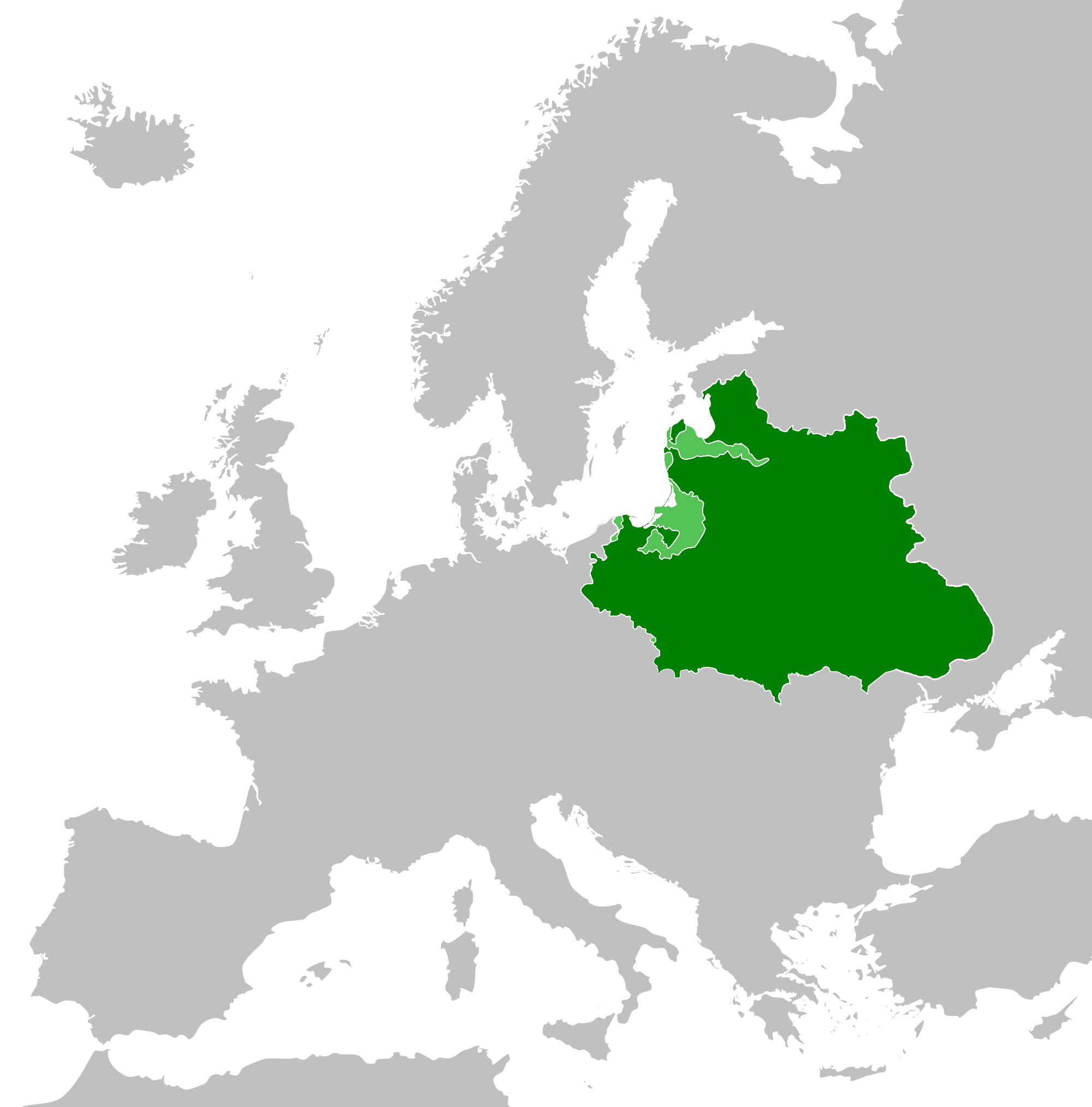
I Rzeczpospolita (Polish–Lithuanian Commonwealth)

II Rzeczpospolita (Second Polish Republic)

III Rzeczpospolita (Third Polish Republic), shown within the European Union

Rzeczpospolita (pronounced [ʐɛt͡ʂpɔsˈpɔlita]) is a traditional Polish term for a political community founded for the common good. The noun "rzeczpospolita", meaning "public welfare, general good or advantage" rzecz "thing, matter" and pospolita "common", is analogous to the Latin rēs pūblica (rēs "thing" + pūblica "public, common"), i.e. republic, in English also rendered as commonwealth, for example, the Polish-Lithuanian Commonwealth. The modern term in English is republic and refers to all modern republics, for instance the French Republic. In modern Polish, the word rzeczpospolita is used exclusively in relation to the Republic of Poland, while any other republic is referred to in Polish as a republika (e.g. Italian Republic – Republika Włoska).

== Origins ==
The term rzeczpospolita is an exact Polish translation of the Latin term res publica. It entered general usage in the sixteenth century. It was adapted for Poland, as it at that time had a unique republican system, similar to the former Roman res publica. The famous quote by Jan Zamoyski, the Lord Chancellor of the Crown, on the importance of education is an example of its use:

Takie będą Rzeczypospolite, jakie ich młodzieży chowanie.

Such will be the Commonwealths as the upbringing of their youth.

— Jan Zamoyski, Foundation Act of the Academy of Zamość; 1600

The meaning of rzeczpospolita is well described by the term commonwealth. As a result, the literal meaning of Rzeczpospolita Polska is "Polish Commonwealth", or "Republic of Poland". Although the first Rzeczpospolita was an elective monarchy, the king had no real power, as most of the state affairs were regulated by the parliament and senate, known as the Sejm.

The Latin name for the Polish–Lithuanian Commonwealth is attested as Respublica Poloniae, also appearing in the fuller form Serenissima Respublica Poloniae.

== Main usage ==
Rzeczpospolita is also used in a series of symbolic names referring to three periods in the history of Poland: (Note: The above list is not a complete list of official titles for the Polish state throughout its history; it is a list of those which are referred to as a rzeczpospolita.)

- I Rzeczpospolita Polska (Polish: Pierwsza Rzeczpospolita) (sometimes translated as the "First Polish Republic") for the Polish–Lithuanian Commonwealth (1569–1795). During this period, the commonwealth was ruled de facto by a privileged class called the szlachta, which had (among numerous others) the right to elect both the king and parliament (the Sejm). This political system is known as the Golden Liberty. It began with the Union of Lublin in 1569 and ended with the third and final Partition of Poland in 1795. Sometimes the term I Rzeczpospolita is used for the country before the Union of Lublin too, because the szlachta started limiting king's autocracy starting in the early 1500s. The Constitution of 3 May 1791 established a common state, the Rzeczpospolita Polska (Polish Commonwealth), however the Reciprocal Guarantee of Two Nations was adopted on 20 October 1791 by the Great Sejm and modified the changes by stressing the continuity of binational status of the state.
- II Rzeczpospolita Polska (Polish: Druga Rzeczpospolita), in reference to the Second Polish Republic (1918–1939). Used to refer to the interwar period, lasting from the regaining of independence in 1918 following the end of World War I up to the World War II-triggering invasion of Poland in 1939 by both Nazi Germany and the Soviet Union. The renascent Polish State was initially called the Republic of Poland (Polish: Republika Polska). The title Rzeczpospolita was introduced by the March Constitution of Poland, the first article of which stated that Państwo Polskie jest Rzecząpospolitą, meaning "the Polish State is a Commonwealth".
- III Rzeczpospolita Polska (Polish: Trzecia Rzeczpospolita), in reference to the current Third Polish Republic (1990–present). This is the title of the present-day Polish state, dating from the fall of the Polish People's Republic and the reintroduction of democratic elections in Poland – the 1990 local government elections (27 May 1990) were the first democratic elections in Poland after World War II.

== Other usage ==
Expressions that make use the concept of rzeczpospolita include:

- Rzeczpospolita szlachecka – Republic of Nobles (szlachta), another name for the I Rzeczpospolita;
- Rzeczpospolita Obojga Narodów – The Commonwealth of Both Nations, another name for the Polish–Lithuanian Commonwealth;
- Rzeczpospolita Trojga Narodów – Republic of Three Nations, a proposed trialist union where Ruthenia (Ukraine) would be elevated as a third member of the Commonwealth, envisioned by the Treaty of Hadiach in response to the Khmelnytsky Uprising;
- Rzeczpospolita Babińska – Babin Republic, a satirical literary society, founded by a group of nobles during the second half of the sixteenth century;
- Rzeczpospolita Krakowska – Free City of Kraków or Republic of Kraków (1815–1846);
- Rzeczpospolita Zakopiańska – Republic of Zakopane, a short-lasting form of an independent state, established for about a month in October 1918;
- Polska Rzeczpospolita Ludowa – Polish People's Republic, a name used formally from 1952 to 1990; was often abbreviated to simply Rzeczpospolita Polska or PRL. Sometimes refers (wrongly) to the post-war period 1944–1952.
- Czwarta Rzeczpospolita – Fourth Polish Republic, a slogan used by the political party Law and Justice.

Nowadays, the terms Rzeczpospolita and Rzeczpospolita Polska are used interchangeably, so far as they relate to the Polish state by default.

Before 1939, Rzeczpospolita was sometimes abbreviated to Rzplita in written documents, while RP is still a common abbreviation for Rzeczpospolita Polska.

The East Slavic cognates of the name are: Russian: Речь Посполитая, romanized: Rječ Pospolitaja; Ukrainian: Річ Посполита, romanized: Rič Pospolyta; Belarusian: Рэч Паспалітая, romanized: Reč Paspalitaja; the West Slavic cognates are Czech: Řeč Pospolitá; Slovak: Reč Pospolitá; and the South Slavic cognates are Slovene: Reč Pospolita, Croatian: Riječ Pospolita, Bosnian: Riječ Pospolita, Serbian: Реч Посполита, romanized: Reč Pospolita, Macedonian: Реч Посполита, romanized: Reč Pospolita, Bulgarian: Реч Посполита, romanized: Reč Pospolita. In the Baltic languages, both the Lithuanian word Žečpospolita and the Latvian word Žečpospoļita are direct borrowings from Polish.

One of Poland's newspapers of record is called Rzeczpospolita.

== See also ==
- History of Poland
- Name of Poland
- Outline of Poland
