= The Republic (Daumier) =

Painting by Honoré Daumier

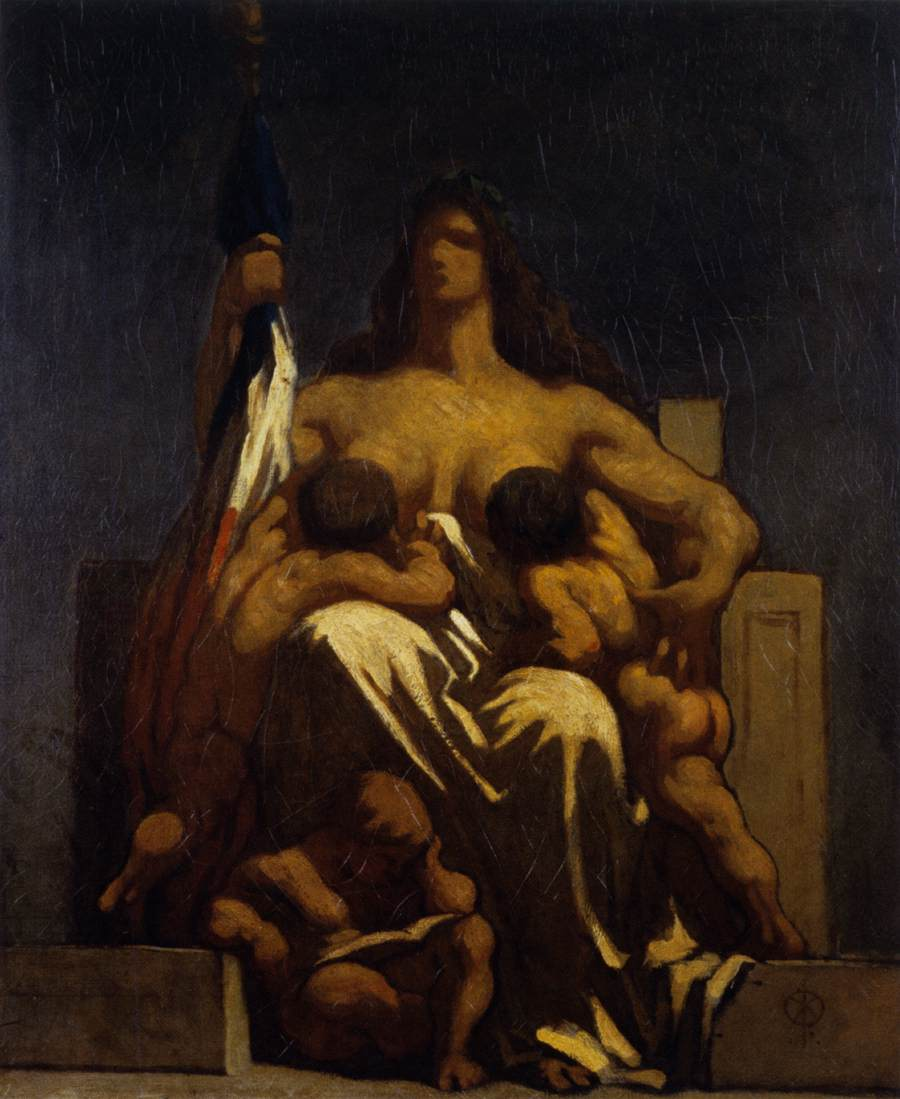
- Artist: Honoré Daumier
- Year: 1848
- Medium: Oil on canvas
- Dimensions: 73 cm × 60 cm (29 in × 24 in)
- Location: Musée d'Orsay, Paris

The Republic, known in French as La République, is an oil-on-canvas painting by the French artist Honoré Daumier, created in 1848. It is a sketch made for a contest that would decide an official painting destined to represent the French Second Republic. It is held at the Musée d'Orsay in Paris.

== History and description ==
The French Second Republic was proclaimed on 24 February 1848, to replace the deposed king Louis Philippe. The new regime started a competition on 14 March 1848 for a sketch that would define the official image of the republic. Daumier, who was a republican and a firm supporter of the new regime, was one of the 700 artists who entered the competition, including Jean-Léon Gérôme and Hippolyte Flandrin, with their final sketches shown at the École des Beaux-Arts in Paris, from 5 to 8 April 1848.

The painting by Daumier, who was best known as a caricaturist, attracted much attention for its composition, which seemed inspired by the Italian painter Andrea del Sarto's work Charity. It represents a half-naked woman, representing the republic, seated, with long brown hair, wearing the Phrygian cap and proudly holding the French tricolour flag with her right hand. The big and muscular woman is breastfeeding two also muscular toddlers, while a third child is seated at her feet, concentrating on her reading. The official website of the Musée d'Orsay states that "this "big woman" summed up an ideal, that of a strong republic, nourishing and educating her children. A "fertile, serene and glorious" republic claiming its descent from the first great republic which had abolished slavery; the republic whose flag had circled the world."

Daumier had positive critics and was placed in 11th place in the contest. However, he did not take part in the final selection, since he never made the expected painting.
