= Res publica =

Latin root of the word "republic"

Res publica, also spelled rēs pūblica to indicate vowel length, is a Latin phrase, loosely meaning "public affair". It is the root of the word republic, and commonwealth has traditionally been used as a synonym for it; however, translations vary widely according to the context. Res is a nominative singular Latin noun for a substantive or concrete thing (matter, thing, affair)—as opposed to spes, which means something unreal or ethereal—and publica is an attributive adjective meaning "of or pertaining to the public, people", hence a literal translation is "the thing, affair of the public," or "the thing, affair of the people."

The most essential characteristic of a res publica was liberty (libertas), which meant freedom from the arbitrary control of another and the absence of monarchical domination over the body politic, that was analogous to the absolute power of a master over a slave.

== In ancient Rome ==
=== Public property ===
Res publica usually is something held in common by many people. For instance, a park or garden in the city of Rome could either be private property (res privata) or managed by the state, in which case it would be part of the res publica.

=== State or commonwealth ===
Taking everything together that is of public interest leads to the connotation that res publica in general equals "the state". For Romans, the state equaled the Roman Empire and all its interests, so Res Publica may also refer to the Roman Empire as a whole, regardless of whether it was governed as a republic or under imperial reign. In this context, scholars suggest commonwealth as a more accurate and neutral translation of the Latin term, as it implies neither republican governance nor imperial rule, but rather refers to the state as a whole; however, translating res publica as "republic" when it clearly refers to the Roman Empire under Imperial reign sometimes occurs.

=== Roman Republic ===
Roman authors would use the phrase res publica in the context of the era when Rome was governed as a republic: the era between the Roman Kingdom and Roman Empire. So in this case, res publica does distinctly not refer to the Roman Empire, but to what is generally described as the Roman Republic.

=== Public affairs or institutions ===
Res publica could also be used in a generic meaning, referring to "public affairs" or the general system of government of a state. In this usage, res publica translated the Greek concept politeia (which originally meant the state organisation of a city-state). Also, for a Roman politician engaging himself in the res publica, a translation can often be the even more generic "being occupied in politics".

=== Other uses ===
Even when limited to its "political" connotations, the meanings of the term res publica in ancient Rome are diverse and multi-layered, and differing from the Greek politeia in many ways, that is, from the several interwoven meanings the word politeia had; however, it is also the customary Latin translation of politeia, and the modern name of Plato's The Republic comes from this usage. In some contexts, the "state organisation system" meaning of res publica derives into something like "constitution", although a constitution, properly speaking, is a much more modern concept. Ancient Romans would use the expression "Twelve Tables" instead of res publica, when referring to their constitution at the time of the republic, and the "inalterable laws installed by the divine Augustus", for their equivalent of a constitution in the era of the early Empire. After the Roman Empire collapsed in the West, the idea of res publica disappeared, as foreign to the barbarians of the Migrations Period: whenever Gregory of Tours refers to res publica, it is the Eastern Empire of which he is speaking.

=== Quotations ===
The translations of the quotations below are copied without alteration from existing non-copyrighted material. Other translations might differ, but they all serve to illustrate the many aspects of the res publica concept in ancient Rome. The Latin original texts are given concurrently with the translations, in order to show that only the context of the text allows to interpret the res publica concept in each instance. From these examples, it also follows that probably there was also a gradual shift of meaning of the res publica concept throughout the Roman era: the "(Roman) Republic" connotation of res publica is something that rather occurs with retrospect to a closed period (so less apparent in Cicero's time, who never knew the era of the Emperors, and could only compare with the epoch of the Kings); on the other hand the translation of the Greek "politeia" concept appears to have nearly completely worn off in late antiquity.

==== Cicero ====
Cicero's De re publica (this translates as "about the res publica"), a treatise of the 1st century BC in Socratic dialogue format, takes the res publica as its subject. The differing interpretations and translations of the title of that work are discussed in the "De re publica" article. The expression res publica is used several times throughout the work too. The quotes below aim at demonstrating that within any translation of Cicero's work differing English translations of the term res publica need to be used, according to context, in order to make sense. The quotes are taken from the Latin text at "The Latin Library" (chapter numbering follows this text), from C. D. Yonge's translation at gutenberg.org (2nd column) and from Francis Barham's translation at "The Online Library of Liberty" (3rd column).

When Cicero refers to the Greek authors (pointing at the "politeia" concept):

| (ch. 16) dein Tubero: 'nescio Africane cur ita memoriae proditum sit, Socratem omnem istam disputationem reiecisse, et tantum de vita et de moribus solitum esse quaerere. quem enim auctorem de illo locupletiorem Platone laudare possumus? cuius in libris multis locis ita loquitur Socrates, ut etiam cum de moribus de virtutibus denique de re publica disputet, numeros tamen et geometriam et harmoniam studeat Pythagorae more coniungere.' | But, then, my Africanus, replied Tubero, of what credit is the tradition which states that Socrates rejected all these physical investigations, and confined his whole attention to men and manners? For, with respect to him what better authority can we cite than Plato? in many passages of whose works Socrates speaks in such a manner that even when he is discussing morals, and virtues, and even public affairs and politics, he endeavors to interweave, after the fashion of Pythagoras, the doctrines of arithmetic, geometry, and harmonic proportions with them. | “But, my Africanus, (replied Tubero) of what credit is this tradition which states that Socrates rejected all these physical investigations, and confined his whole attention to men and manners? In this respect, what better authority can we cite than Plato's? And in many passages of his works, Socrates speaks in a very different manner, and even in his discussions respecting morals, and virtues, and politics, he endeavours to interweave, after the fashion of Pythagoras, the doctrines of arithmetic, geometry, and harmonic proportions.” |

When pointing at the Roman context:

| (ch. 9) Iam illa, perfugia quae sumunt sibi ad excusationem quo facilius otio perfruantur, certe minime sunt audienda, cum ita dicunt accedere ad rem publicam plerumque homines nulla re bona dignos, cum quibus comparari sordidum, confligere autem multitudine praesertim incitata miserum et periculosum sit. quam ob rem neque sapientis esse accipere habenas cum insanos atque indomitos impetus volgi cohibere non possit, neque liberi cum inpuris atque inmanibus adversariis decertantem vel contumeliarum verbera subire, vel expectare sapienti non ferendas iniurias: proinde quasi bonis et fortibus et magno animo praeditis ulla sit ad rem publicam adeundi causa iustior, quam ne pareant inprobis, neve ab isdem lacerari rem publicam patiantur, cum ipsi auxilium ferre si cupiant non queant. | Those apologies, therefore, in which men take refuge as an excuse for their devoting themselves with more plausibility to mere inactivity do certainly not deserve to be listened to; when, for instance, they tell us that those who meddle with public affairs are generally good-for-nothing men, with whom it is discreditable to be compared, and miserable and dangerous to contend, especially when the multitude is in an excited state. On which account it is not the part of a wise man to take the reins, since he cannot restrain the insane and unregulated movements of the common people. Nor is it becoming to a man of liberal birth, say they, thus to contend with such vile and unrefined antagonists, or to subject one's self to the lashings of contumely, or to put one's self in the way of injuries which ought not to be borne by a wise man. As if to a virtuous, brave, and magnanimous man there could be a juster reason for seeking the government than this—to avoid being subjected to worthless men, and to prevent the Commonwealth from being torn to pieces by them; when, even if they were then desirous to save her, they would not have the power. | Those apologies, therefore, which undertake to furnish us with an easy excuse for living in selfish inactivity, are certainly not worth hearing. They tell us that to meddle with public affairs and popular demagogues, incapable of all goodness, with whom it is disgraceful to mix; and to struggle with the passions of the insensate multitude, is a most miserable and hazardous life. On which account, no wise man will take the reins, since he cannot restrain the insane and unregulated movements of the lower orders. Nor is it acting like a gentleman (say they) thus to contend with antagonists so unwashed and so unrefined (impuris atque immanibus adversariis) or subject yourself to the lashings of contumely, of which the wisest will always have most to bear. As if to virtuous, brave, and magnanimous men, there could be a juster reason for seeking the government than this, that we should not be subjected to scoundrels, nor suffer the commonwealth to be distracted by them, lest we should discover, too late, when we desire to save her, that we are without the power. |

The translation shows that the meaning of res publica can differ even within the same paragraph...

==== Pliny the Elder ====
When Pliny dedicates his Naturalis Historiae to his friend Emperor Vespasian in the first century, he uses the word res publica (Latin from LacusCurtius website / 1601 Philemon Holland translation from https://penelope.uchicago.edu/holland/index.html / 1855 John Bostock translation from the Perseus website):

| (I) triumphalis et censorius tu sexiesque consul ac tribuniciae potestatis particeps et, quod his nobilius fecisti, dum illud patri pariter et equestri ordini praestas, praefectus praetorii eius omniaque haec rei publicae es: nobis quidem qualis in castrensi contubernio, nec quicquam in te mutavit fortunae amplitudo, nisi ut prodesse tantundem posses et velles. | For albeit you have triumphed with him for your noble victories, been Censor in your time, and Consul six times,7 times executed the sacred authority of the Tribunes, patrones, and protectors of the Commons of Rome, together with him; albeit I say you have otherwise with your noble heart honouring and gracing both the court of the Emperor your father, and also the whole state of Knights and Gentlemen of Rome, whiles you were captain of the guard, and Grand master of his house and royal palace (in which places all, you carried your selfe respectively to the good of the Commonwealth) yet to all your friends, and especially to myself, you have borne the same colours, and lodged together in one pavilion. | You, who have had the honour of a triumph, and of the censorship, have been six times consul, and have shared in the tribunate; and, what is still more honourable, whilst you held them in conjunction with your Father, you have presided over the Equestrian order, and been the Prefect of the Prætorians : all this you have done for the service of the Republic, and, at the same time, have regarded me as a fellow-soldier and a messmate. |

When under an Emperor, that is Vespasian or his predecessors, Pliny was not talking about the Roman Republic, but used "commonwealth"/"republic" in the meaning of "the state". The ambiguity of Rome still considering itself formally, or just "pro forma", a republic throughout the era of the principate, when a monarchic rule had already de facto been established, adds to the complexity of translating "res publica" in this context.

==== Tacitus ====
As another example of the complexities of the meaning of the word res publica one can cite Tacitus, who in the early 2nd century described in his Annals how the first Emperors, like Tiberius in the year Augustus had died (AD 14), sought to preserve all institutions of the Res publica completely intact (Latin and translation as available at the Perseus Project):

| (I.7) Nam Tiberius cuncta per consules incipiebat, tamquam vetere re publica et ambiguus imperandi: ne edictum quidem, quo patres in curiam vocabat, nisi tribuniciae potestatis praescriptione posuit sub Augusto acceptae. | For Tiberius would inaugurate everything with the consuls, as though the ancient constitution remained, and he hesitated about being emperor. Even the proclamation by which he summoned the senators to their chamber, he issued merely with the title of Tribune, which he had received under Augustus. |

... while Tacitus complained in the same writing that at the same time the res publica went astray for good because not a single soul seemed to care any more:

| (I.3-4) quotus quisque reliquus qui rem publicam vidisset? Igitur verso civitatis statu nihil usquam prisci et integri moris: omnes exuta aequalitate iussa principis aspectare... | How few were left who had seen the republic! Thus the State had been revolutionised, and there was not a vestige left of the old sound morality. Stript of equality, all looked up to the commands of a sovereign... |

The least that can be said is that the two quotes above (like so many passages in Tacitus' writings) are a translator's minefield:

- In the first quote above Tacitus qualifies the res publica he intends as "vetus" (the "old" res publica) - which implies he knows another, not "old", "re(s)public(a)", while Tacitus' dense writing style would usually avoid redundancies. Nonetheless in the second quote, actually preceding the first in the text of the Annals, "res publica" does not have such qualifier, while in the context it is clear he meant the then lost republican form of government.
- "imperandi", litt. "to command", is translated as "being emperor" - while the "emperor" concept (which in fact did not yet literally exist in the time Tacitus describes here, and so could not be assigned to Tiberius as an intention) was usually indicated as "princeps" by Tacitus.
- "tribunicia potestas" is translated as "title of Tribune", while the "tribunicia potestas" is more about exercising the power of a tribune without actually being a Tribune, and had been an invention of Caesar Augustus (compare to Holland and Bostock translations for the same concept in the Pliny quote above: "sacred authoritie of the Tribunes" and "the tribunate", respectively).

Nonetheless it can only be admired in Tacitus how, with some judicially chosen words, he most poignantly and to the point describes the transition from "(overdue) remnants of the republic" to "actual Imperial reign, already established in the minds of people".

In his book Germania, Tacitus also uses res publica in the context of the Germanic "barbarian" society. Here the word is used to convey the generic meaning of "public affair" or "the commonwealth" (in contrast to the private or family life) without the Roman connotations of republicanism. This is illustrated in the following text (Latin text and English translation from the Perseus Project):

| (Ch. 13) Nihil autem neque publicae neque privatae rei nisi armati agunt. Sed arma sumere non ante cuiquam moris quam civitas suffecturum probaverit. Tum in ipso concilio vel principum aliquis vel pater vel propinqui scuto frameaque iuvenem ornant: haec apud illos toga, hic primus iuventae honos; ante hoc domus pars videntur, mox rei publicae. | They transact no public or private business without being armed. It is not, however, usual for anyone to wear arms till the state has recognised his power to use them. Then in the presence of the council one of the chiefs, or the young man's father, or some kinsman, equips him with a shield and a spear. These arms are what the "toga" is with us, the first honour with which youth is invested. Up to this time he is regarded as a member of a household, afterwards as a member of the commonwealth. |

==== Augustine ====
Augustine of Hippo uses the word res publica several times throughout his work The City of God, in which he comments, in the early 5th century on several Greek and Roman authors. Again, the standard translations of the expression "res publica" are multiple throughout the work. Examples taken from the Latin text at "The Latin Library", English translation from the version available at "New Advent"

Meaning "the (Roman) state" in general:

| (III,1) Verum ne nimis longum faciam, tacebo aliarum usquequaque gentium mala grauissima: quod ad Romam pertinet Romanumque imperium tantum loquar, id est ad ipsam proprie ciuitatem et quaecumque illi terrarum uel societate coniunctae uel condicione subiectae sunt, quae sint perpessae ante aduentum Christi, cum iam ad eius quasi corpus rei publicae pertinerent. | But that I may not be prolix, I will be silent regarding the heavy calamities that have been suffered by any other nations, and will speak only of what happened to Rome and the Roman empire, by which I mean Rome properly so called, and those lands which already, before the coming of Christ, had by alliance or conquest become, as it were, members of the body of the state. |

Note that in this quote Augustine does not use the expression imperium Romanum ("the Roman empire") as a synonym to "the era when Rome was governed by emperors". Compare also to the 2nd quote from Tacitus above: there an expression different from res publica and imperium Romanum is used for referring to "the (Roman) State" in general.

Meaning "the Roman Republic" as era with a distinct form of state organisation, from the same book:

| (III,7) Adhuc autem meliorum partium ciuilium Sulla dux fuit, adhuc armis rem publicam recuperare moliebatur; horum bonorum initiorum nondum malos euentus habuit. | Now, up to this time, Sylla's cause was the more worthy of the two; for till now he used arms to restore the republic, and as yet his good intentions had met with no reverses. |

== Calques ==
Later calques of Res publica:

- Commonwealth (English – 2nd meaning as indicated above)
- chose publique (French)
- cosa pubblica (Italian)
- Rzeczpospolita (Polish)
- Civitas
- Public
