= Commonwealth =

Political community established for common good

A commonwealth is a traditional English term for a political community founded for the common good. The noun "commonwealth", meaning "public welfare, general good or advantage", dates from the 15th century. Originally a phrase (the common-wealth or the common wealth – echoed in the modern synonym "public wealth"), it comes from the old meaning of "wealth", which is "well-being", and was deemed analogous to the Latin res publica. The term literally meant common well being. In the 17th century, the definition of "commonwealth" expanded from its original sense of "public welfare" or "commonweal" to mean "a state in which the supreme power is vested in the people; a republic or democratic state".

The term evolved to become a title to a number of political entities. Three countries – Australia, The Bahamas, and Dominica – have the official title "Commonwealth", as do four U.S. states and two U.S. territories. Since the early 20th century, the term has been used to name some associations of states, most notably the Commonwealth of Nations, an organisation primarily of former territories of the British Empire. It is also used in the translation for the organisation made up of formerly Soviet states, the Commonwealth of Independent States.

== Historical use ==
=== Rome ===
Translations of Ancient Roman writers' works to English have on occasion translated "Res publica", and variants thereof, to "the commonwealth", a term referring to the Roman state as a whole.

=== England ===
The Commonwealth of England was the official name of the political unit (de facto military rule in the name of parliamentary supremacy) that replaced the Kingdom of England (after the English Civil War) from 1649 to 1653 and 1659 to 1660, under the rule of Oliver Cromwell and his son and successor Richard. From 1653 to 1659, although still legally known as a Commonwealth, the republic, united with the former Kingdom of Scotland, operated under different institutions (at times as a de facto monarchy) and is known by historians as the Protectorate. In a British context, it is sometimes referred to as the "Old Commonwealth".

In the later 20th century a socialist political party known as the Common Wealth Party was active. Previously a similarly named party, the Commonwealth Land Party, was in existence.

=== Iceland ===
The period of Icelandic history from the establishment of the Althing in 930 to the pledge of fealty to the Norwegian king in 1262 is usually called the Icelandic Nation (Icelandic: Þjóðveldið) in Icelandic and the Icelandic Commonwealth in English. In this period Iceland was colonized by a public consisting largely of recent immigrants from Norway who had fled the unification of that country under King Harald Fairhair.

=== Philippines ===
The Commonwealth of the Philippines was the administrative body that governed the Philippines from 1935 to 1946, aside from a period of exile in the Second World War from 1942 to 1945 when Japan occupied the country. It replaced the Insular Government, a United States territorial government, and was established by the Tydings–McDuffie Act. The Commonwealth was designed as a transitional administration in preparation for the country's full achievement of independence, which was achieved in 1946. The Commonwealth of the Philippines was a founding member of the United Nations.

=== Poland–Lithuania ===
Republic is still an alternative translation of the traditional name Rzeczpospolita of the Polish–Lithuanian Commonwealth. Wincenty Kadłubek (Vincent Kadlubo, 1160–1223) used for the first time the original Latin term res publica in the context of Poland in his "Chronicles of the Kings and Princes of Poland". The name was used officially for the confederal union formed by Poland and Lithuania (1569–1795).

It is also often referred as "Nobles' Commonwealth" (1505–1795, i.e., before the union). In the contemporary political doctrine of the Polish–Lithuanian Commonwealth, "our state is a Republic (or Commonwealth) under the presidency of the King". The Commonwealth introduced a doctrine of religious tolerance called Warsaw Confederation, had its own parliament Sejm (although elections were restricted to nobility and elected kings, who were bound to certain contracts Pacta conventa from the beginning of the reign).

"A commonwealth of good counsaile" was the title of the 1607 English translation of the work of Wawrzyniec Grzymała Goślicki "De optimo senatore" that presented to English readers many of the ideas present in the political system of the Polish–Lithuanian Commonwealth.

=== Catalonia ===
Between 1914 and 1925, Catalonia functioned as an administrative union of its four provinces under the Mancomunitat de Catalunya, often translated into English as the “Commonwealth of Catalonia”. The institution possessed limited powers and coordinated regional infrastructure, education, and cultural policy as a federation of the provincial councils of Barcelona, Girona, Lleida, and Tarragona. During its existence, the Mancomunitat promoted the development of Catalan-language institutions, including libraries, research bodies, and technical education establishments.

=== Liberia ===
Between 1838 and 1847, Liberia was officially known as the "Commonwealth of Liberia". It changed its name to the "Republic of Liberia" when it declared independence (and adopted a new constitution) in 1847.

=== Lunda Empire ===
The Lunda Empire in southeastern DR Congo has frequently been referred to as a commonwealth because it was not ruled from one centre and involved numerous independent though connected states.

== Current use ==
=== Australia ===
"Commonwealth" was first proposed as a term for a federation of the six Australian crown colonies at the 1891 constitutional convention in Sydney. Its adoption was initially controversial, as it was associated by some with the republicanism of Oliver Cromwell (see above), but it was retained in all subsequent drafts of the constitution. The term was finally incorporated into law in the Commonwealth of Australia Constitution Act 1900, which established the federation. Australia operates under a federal system, in which power is divided between the federal (national) government and the state governments (the successors of the six colonies). So, in an Australian context, the term "Commonwealth" (capitalised), which is often abbreviated to Cth, refers to the federal government, and "Commonwealth of Australia" is the official name of the country.

=== The Bahamas ===
The Bahamas, a Commonwealth realm, has used the official style Commonwealth of The Bahamas since its independence in 1973.

=== Dominica ===
The small Caribbean republic of Dominica has used the official style Commonwealth of Dominica since 1978.

=== Certain U.S. states and territories ===
==== States ====
Four states of the United States of America officially designate themselves as "commonwealths". All four were part of Great Britain's possessions along the Atlantic coast of North America prior to the American Revolution. As such, they share a strong influence of English common law in some of their laws and institutions. The four are:

- Kentucky is designated a commonwealth by the Kentucky Constitution as the "Commonwealth of Kentucky".
- Massachusetts is a commonwealth, declaring itself as such in its constitution, which states: "[T]he body politic is formed by a voluntary association of individuals: it is a social compact, by which the whole people covenants with each citizen, and each citizen with the whole people, that all shall be governed by certain laws for the common good."
- Pennsylvania uses the "Commonwealth of Pennsylvania" constitutionally and in its official title.
- Virginia has been known as the "Commonwealth of Virginia" since before the American Revolutionary War, and is referred to as a commonwealth in its constitution.

==== Territories ====
Two organized but unincorporated U.S. territories are called commonwealths. The two are:

- Commonwealth of Puerto Rico, since 1952
- Commonwealth of the Northern Mariana Islands, since 1978

In 2016, the Washington, D.C. city council also selected "Douglass Commonwealth" as the potential name of State of Washington, D.C., following the 2016 statehood referendum, at least partially in order to retain the initials "D.C." as the state's abbreviation.

=== International bodies ===
==== Commonwealth of Nations ====
The Commonwealth of Nations is a voluntary association of 56 independent sovereign states, most of which were once part of the British Empire. The Commonwealth's membership includes both republics and monarchies. The Head of the Commonwealth is King Charles III, who also reigns as monarch in the 15 member states known as Commonwealth realms since his accession in 2022.

==== Commonwealth of Independent States ====
The Commonwealth of Independent States (CIS) is a loose alliance or confederation consisting of nine of the 15 former Soviet Republics, the exceptions being Turkmenistan (a CIS associate member), Lithuania, Latvia, Estonia, Ukraine, and Georgia. Georgia left the CIS in August 2008 following the 2008 invasion of the Russian military into South Ossetia and Abkhazia. Its creation signalled the dissolution of the Soviet Union, its purpose being to "allow a civilised divorce" between the Soviet Republics. The CIS has developed as a forum by which the member-states can co-operate in economics, defence, and foreign policy.

== Proposed use ==
=== United Kingdom ===
Labour MP Tony Benn sponsored a Commonwealth of Britain Bill several times between 1991 and 2001, intended to abolish the monarchy and establish a British republic. It never reached second reading.

== See also ==
- Confederation
- Democracy
- Federation
- League
