= John Campbell (author) =

Scottish author

- Occupation: Writer

John Campbell (8 March 1708 – 28 December 1775) was a Scottish author. He contributed to George Sale's Universal History, and wrote a Political Survey of Britain (1774). He was both prolific and well paid: according to James Boswell, Samuel Johnson spoke of Campbell to Joseph Warton as 'the richest author that ever grazed the common of literature.'

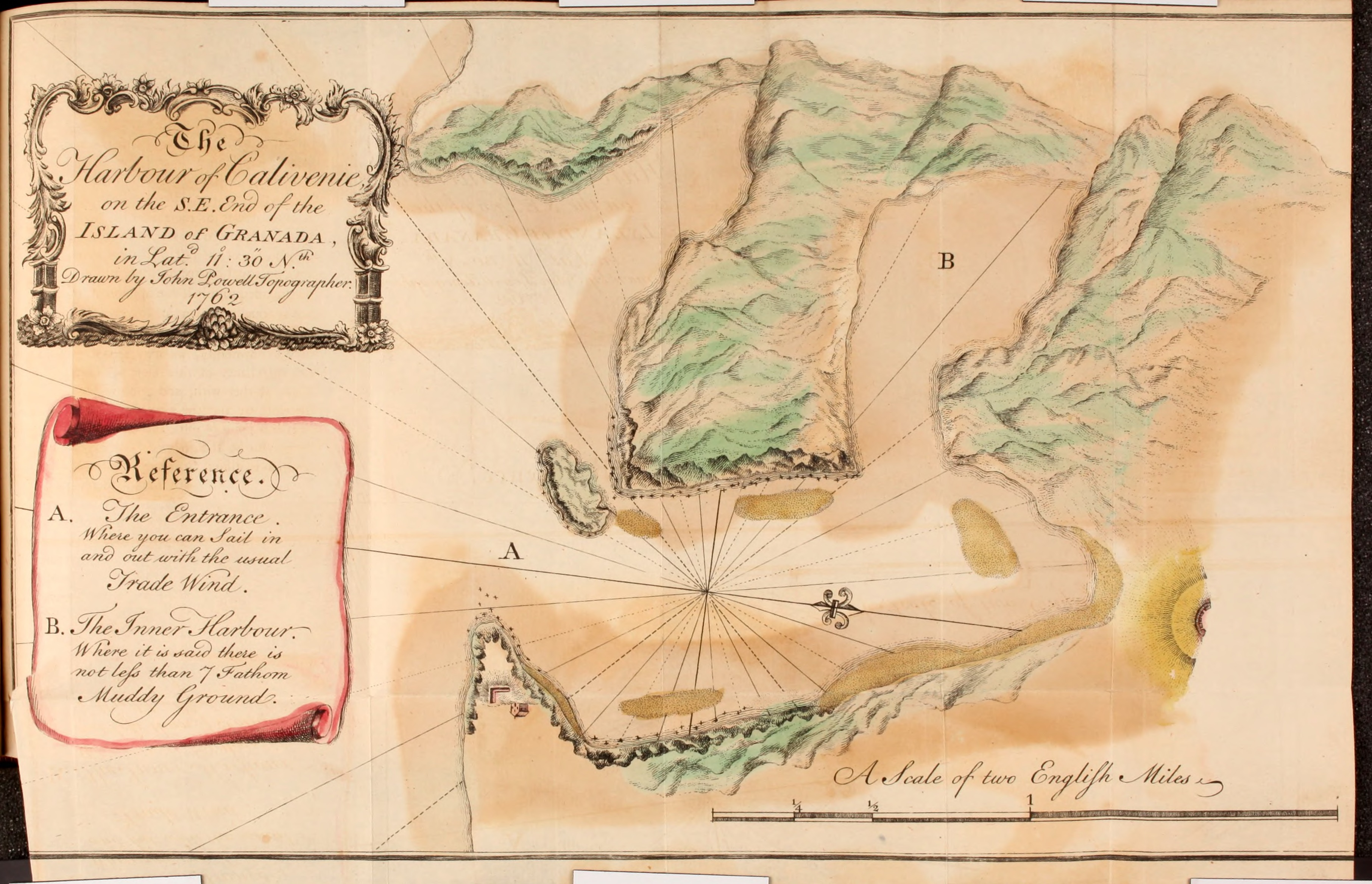
Candid and impartial considerations on the nature of the sugar trade, by John Campbell.

== Life ==
He was the son of a Campbell of Glenlyon, captain in a regiment of horse, and was born at Edinburgh on 8 March 1708. At the age of five he was taken to Windsor by his mother, originally of that town, and educated under the direction of an uncle, who placed him as a clerk in an attorney's office. He left the law for literature, in the 1730s.

In 1754 the University of Glasgow conferred on him the degree of LL.D. In March 1765 he was appointed his majesty's agent for the Province of Georgia, and held the office until his death. He died on 28 December 1775, having received in the preceding year from the Empress Catherine of Russia a present of her portrait.

== Early works ==
Campbell produced at the age of 28 a Military History of the late Prince Eugene of Savoy and the late John, Duke of Marlborough … illustrated with variety of copper-plates of battles, sieges, plans, &c., carefully engraved by Claude Du Bosc, issued without the compiler's name in 1736. In compiling it Campbell used the Marquis de Quincy's Histoire Militaire du règne de Louis Quatorze, and the works of Jean Dumont and Jean Rousset de Missy on Prince Eugene of Savoy. In 1734 appeared, under Campbell's name, A View of the Changes to which the Trade of Great Britain to Turkey and Italy will be exposed if Naples and Sicily fall into the hands of the Spaniards. Campbell suggested that the Two Sicilies should be handed over to the Elector of Bavaria.

His first major original work was The Travels and Adventures of Edward Brown, Esq., formerly a merchant in London (1739), fictitious autobiography in the style of Daniel Defoe. The description given in it by three Arab brothers (pp. 327–8) of a strayed camel, which they had never seen, may have suggested to Voltaire the description of the dog and horse of the queen and king of Babylon in Zadig (1746). In 1739, too, appeared Campbell's Memoirs of the Bashaw Duke de Ripperda (second edition 1750).

== The "Universal History" ==
Campbell began to contribute to the (Ancient) Universal History (1740–1744). Only the Cosmogony section is assigned to him by the Biographia Britannica, but in the list of the writers communicated by John Swinton to Samuel Johnson the Cosmogony is attributed to George Sale, and the History of the Persians and the Constantinopolitan Empire to Campbell. To the Modern Universal History he contributed the histories of the Portuguese, Dutch, French, Swedish, Danish, and Ostend settlements in the East Indies; and histories of Spain, Portugal, Algarves, Navarre; and that of France from Clovis I to the year 1656.

== Further works ==
In 1741 Campbell's Concise History of Spanish America (second edition 1755) appeared, and in 1742 A Letter to a Friend in the Country on the Publication of Thurloe's State Papers, in which John Thurloe's then newly issued folios were reviewed. Also in 1742 volumes I. and II. of Lives of the Admirals, and other Eminent British Seamen were published; the remaining two volumes appearing in 1744. The work was translated into German, and three other editions of it were published in Campbell's lifetime. After his death there were several more, with continuations, an abridgement appearing in 1870.

In 1743 appeared anonymously Campbell's English version, with copious annotations, of the Latin work of Johann Heinrich Cohausen, Hermippus Redivivus; or, the Sage's Triumph over Old Age and the Grave. It reached a third edition in 1771. In 1743 also appeared his translation from the Dutch, The True Interest and Political Maxims of the Republic of Holland. The original was ascribed wrongly to John de Witt; Campbell added memoirs of Cornelius and John de Witt.

In 1744 was published Campbell's enlarged edition of John Harris's Collection of Voyages and Travels (1702–05), Navigantium atque Itinerantium Bibliotheca. In the Account of the European Settlements in America, attributed to William Burke and Edmund Burke, the author expresses his obligations to this colossal work. A new edition in numbers was completed in 1749.

To Campbell has been generally ascribed the recast (1744) of The Shepherd of Banbury's Rules to judge of the Changes of the Weather, by "John Claridge, shepherd", first issued in 1670, and popular in rural districts. Little more than a few words of the original title remained in the recast, which was frequently reprinted into the nineteenth century. It attempted to base on principles the weather forecasts of the alleged Banbury shepherd.

In 1747 Campbell's The Spanish Empire in America was published.

== Periodicals ==
To the first Biographia Britannica, the issue of which in weekly numbers began in 1745, Campbell's contributions, signed E. and X., were copious; but they ceased with the publication of vol. iv. Among them were biographies of members of noble British families. In 1750 there appeared, mainly reprinted from a periodical, 'The Museum,' his work The Political State of Europe, which went through six editions in his lifetime, and gave him a wide reputation. It consisted of summaries of the history of the most prominent European states, with remarks on their international relations, and on the policy of their rulers and governments.

== Later works ==
A Full and Particular Description of the Highlands of Scotland, its Situation and Produce, the Manners and Customs of the Natives (1752) contained a highly coloured account of the highlanders and of the resources of the Scottish Highlands. After the Peace of Paris, 1763, he wrote, at Lord Bute's request, a Description and History of the new Sugar Islands in the West Indies, to show the value of those which had been ceded by the French at the close of the Seven Years' War.

In 1774 appeared his last work, A Political Survey of Great Britain, being a series of reflections on the situation, lands, inhabitants, revenues, colonies, and commerce of the island (2 vols. London, 1774). It mentions projects for the construction of harbours, the opening up of new communications by road and canal, and the introduction of new industries. Campbell proposed that the state should buy up all the waste lands of the country and develop their latent resources, arable and pastoral. Many years had been spent in its preparation, and some of the original subscribers were dead before it appeared.

The memoir of Campbell in Andrew Kippis's Biographia Britannica gives a list including further writings.
