= Greco-Roman world =

Areas of influence by ancient Greece and Rome

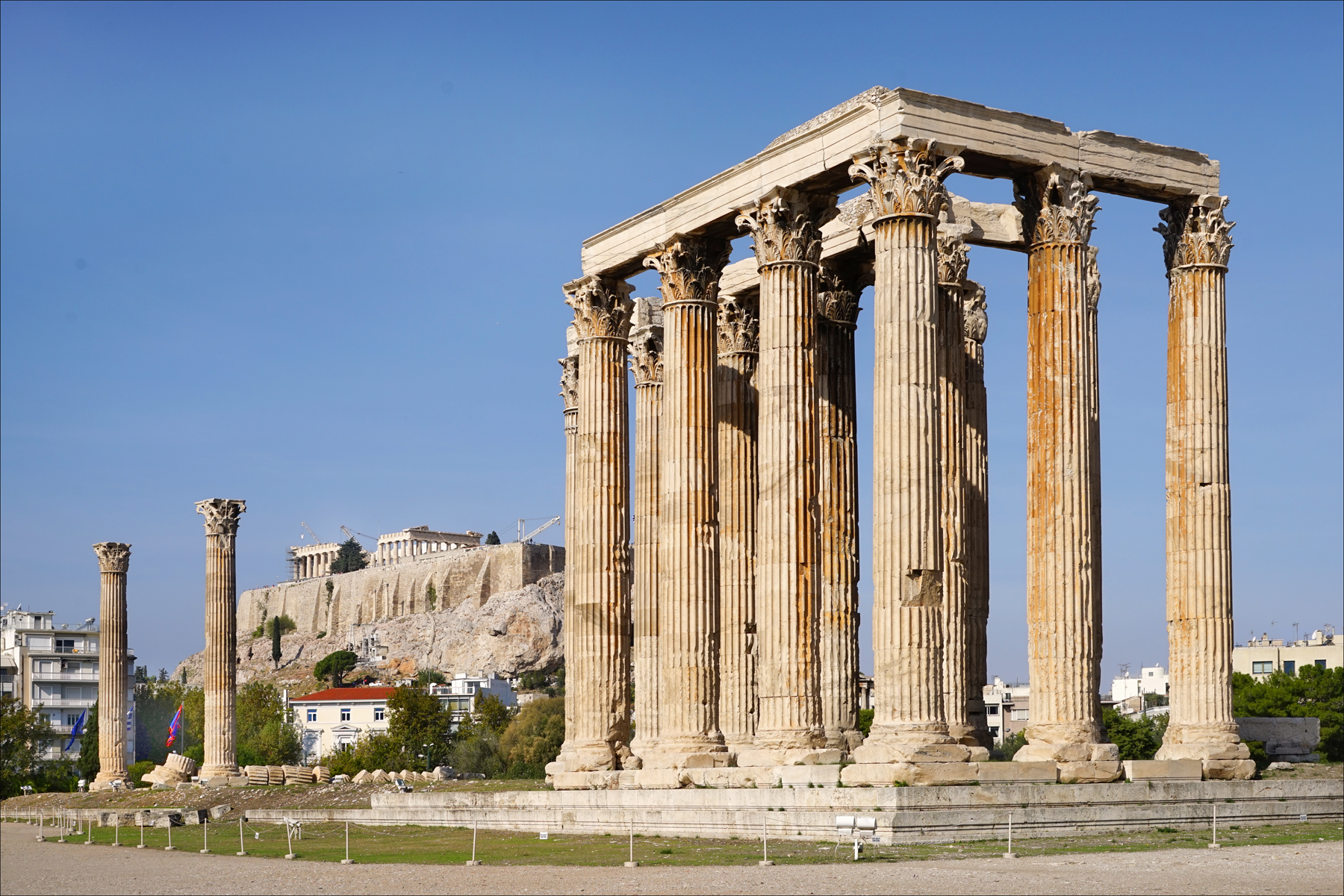
The Temple of Olympian Zeus in Athens, construction started by Athenian tyrants in the 6th century BC and completed by Roman Emperor Hadrian in the 2nd century AD

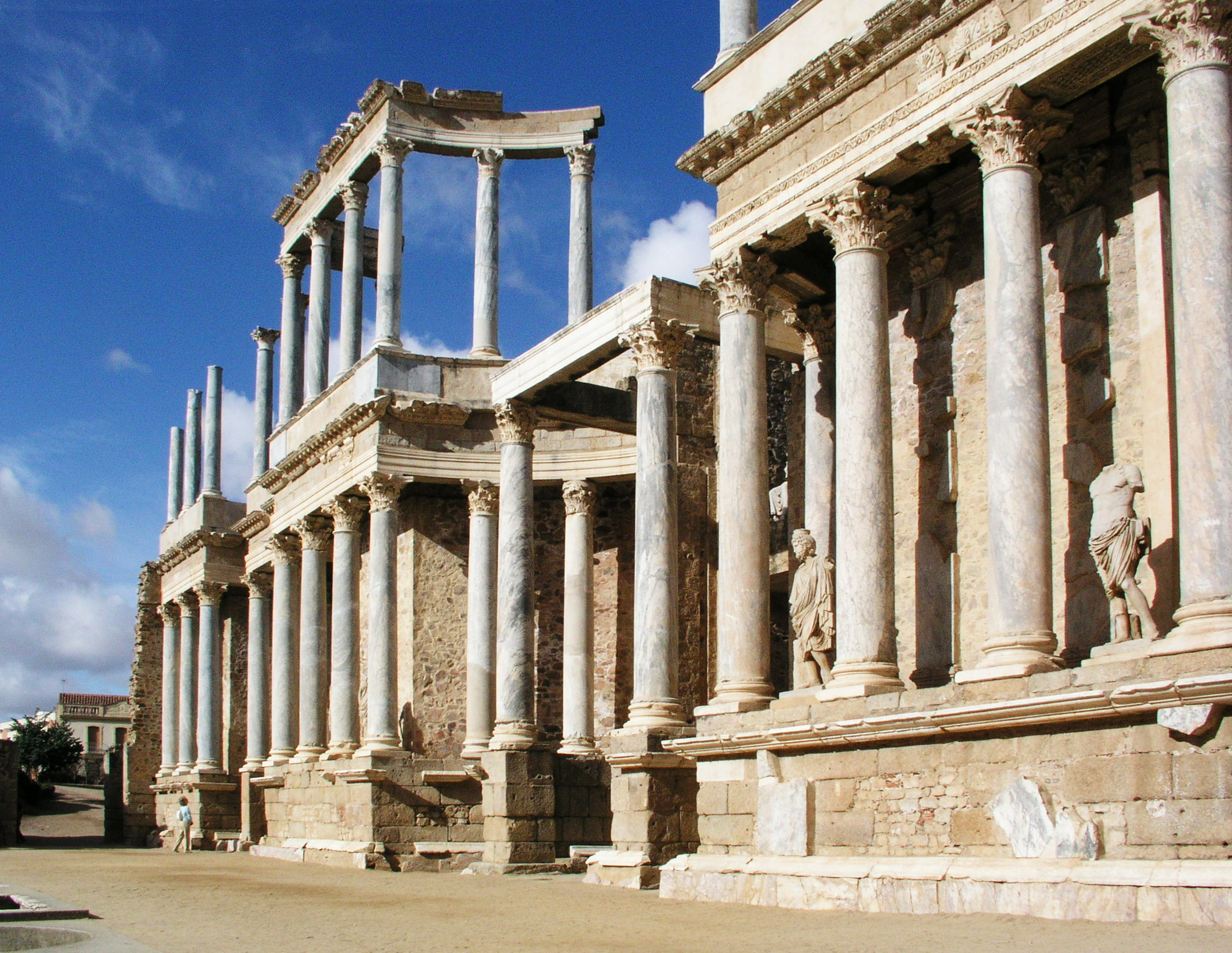
The Roman Theatre of Mérida, Spain

The Greco-Roman world (/ˌɡrɛkoʊˈroʊmən, ˌɡriːkoʊ-, ˌɡreɪkoʊ-/) – also Greco-Roman civilization, Greco-Roman culture, or Greco-Latin culture (spelled Græco- or Graeco- in British English) – is the modern term for the regions that historically and culturally fell under the direct influence of the language, culture, government, and religion of the ancient Greeks and Romans. The two cultures first blended significantly within the military sphere of the Roman Republic, and then the widening Roman Empire. The term "classical antiquity" describes the accompanying time period when Greco-Roman culture exerted its greatest influence and dominance on the European continent. In these regions, the cultural perceptions, ideas, and sensitivities of these peoples became dominant in classical antiquity.

That process was aided by the universal adoption of Greek as the language of intellectual culture and commerce in the Eastern Mediterranean and of Latin as the language of public administration and of law, especially in the Western Mediterranean.

Greek and Latin were never the native languages of many or most of the rural peasants, who formed the great majority of the Roman Empire's population. They became the languages of the urban and cosmopolitan elites and the Empire's lingua franca for those who lived within the large territories and populations outside the Macedonian settlements and the Roman colonies.

All Roman citizens of note and accomplishment, regardless of their ethnic extractions, spoke and wrote in Greek or Latin. Examples include the Roman jurist and imperial chancellor Ulpian of Phoenician origin; the mathematician and geographer Claudius Ptolemy of Greco-Egyptian ethnicity; and the theologian Augustine of Berber origin. The historian Flavius Josephus, who was of Jewish origin, spoke and wrote in Greek.

== Geographic extent ==
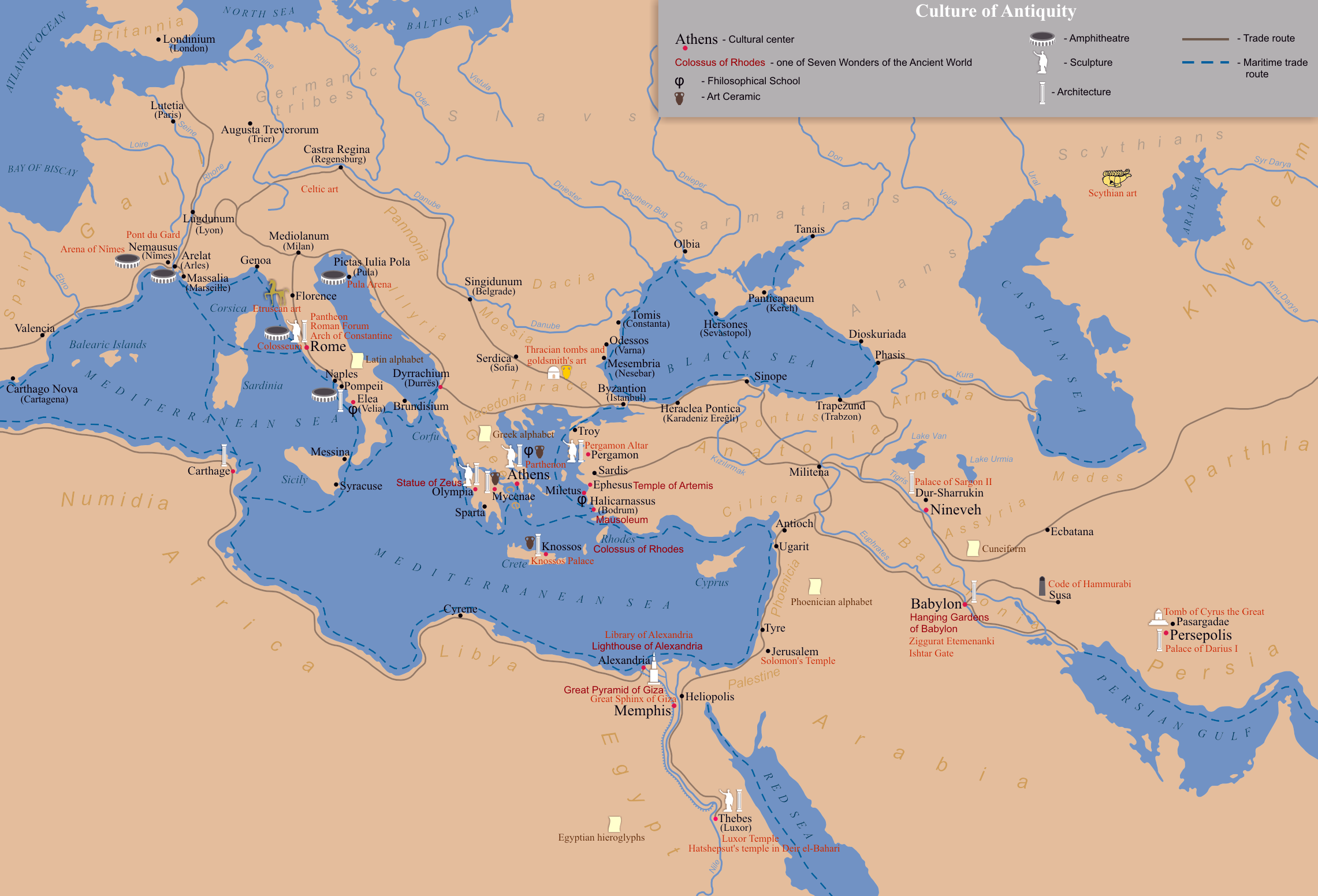
A map of the ancient world, centered on Greece.

Based on the above definition, the "cores" of the Greco-Roman world can be confidently stated to have been the coasts of the Mediterranean Sea, specifically the Italian Peninsula, Greece, Cyprus, the Iberian Peninsula (Spain, Portugal and Andorra), the Anatolian Peninsula (Turkey), Thrace, Paionia, and Gaul (France), the Syrian region (modern-day Levantine countries, Central and Northern Syria, Lebanon, Israel and Palestine), Egypt, Roman Africa, (corresponding to western Libya, Tunisia, and eastern Algeria), and Mauretania (western Algeria and Morocco).

Occupying the periphery of that world were the so-called "Roman Germany" (the modern-day Alpine countries of Austria and Switzerland and the Agri Decumates, southwestern Germany), the Illyricum (modern-day Northern Albania, Montenegro, Bosnia and Herzegovina and the coast of Croatia), Moesia (roughly corresponding to modern-day Central Serbia, Kosovo, Northern Bulgaria, and Romanian Dobrudja), and Pannonia (corresponding to modern-day Western Hungary, the Austrian Länder of Burgenland, Eastern Slovenia and Northern Serbia).

Also included were Dacia (roughly corresponding to modern-day Romania and Moldavia), Nubia (a region roughly corresponding to the far south of Egypt and modern-day Northern Sudan), Arabia Petraea (corresponding to modern-day Hejaz region of Saudi Arabia, Jordan, Southern Syria and Egypt's Sinai Peninsula), and the Tauric Chersonesus (modern-day Crimea and the coast of Ukraine).

The Greco-Roman world had another "world" or empire to its east, the Persians, with which there was constant interaction: Xenophon's Anabasis (the 'March Upcountry'), the Greco-Persian wars, the famous battles of Marathon and Salamis, the Greek tragedy The Persians by Aeschylus, Alexander the Great's defeat of the Persian emperor Darius III and conquest of the Persian empire, or the later Roman generals' difficulties with the Persian armies, such as Pompey the Great, and of Marcus Licinius Crassus (conqueror of the slave general Spartacus), who was defeated in the field by a Persian force and was beheaded by them.

== Culture ==
Fayum mummy portrait of a man from Roman Egypt, showing the influence of Greek painting traditions, 2nd century AD

In the schools of art, philosophy, and rhetoric, the foundations of education were transmitted throughout the lands of Greek and Roman rule. Within its educated class, spanning all of the "Greco-Roman" eras, the testimony of literary borrowings and influences are overwhelming proofs of a mantle of mutual knowledge. For example, several hundred papyrus volumes found in a Roman villa at Herculaneum are in Greek. The lives of Cicero and Julius Caesar are examples of Romans who frequented schools in Greece.

The installation, both in Greek and Latin, of Augustus's monumental eulogy, the Res Gestae, exemplifies the official recognition of the dual vehicles for the common culture. The familiarity of figures from Roman legend and history in the Parallel Lives by Plutarch is one example of the extent to which "universal history" was then synonymous with the accomplishments of famous Latins and Hellenes. Most educated Romans were likely bilingual in Greek and Latin.

== Architecture ==
Graeco-Roman architecture in the Roman world followed the principles and styles that had been established by ancient Greece. That era's most representative building was the temple. Other prominent structures that represented that style included government buildings like the Roman Senate. The three primary styles of column design used in temples in classical Greece were Doric, Ionic, and Corinthian. Some examples of Doric architecture are the Parthenon and the Temple of Hephaestus in Athens, and the Erechtheum, next to the Parthenon, is Ionic.

== Politics ==
=== Ancient Greece ===
A sculpture of Aristotle

In Ancient Greece, several philosophers and historians analysed and described elements we now recognize as classical republicanism. Traditionally, the Greek concept of "politeia" was rendered into Latin as res publica. Consequently, political theory until relatively recently often used republic in the general sense of "regime". There is no single written expression or definition from this era that exactly corresponds with a modern understanding of the term "republic" but most of the essential features of the modern definition are present in the works of Plato, Aristotle, and Polybius.

These include theories of mixed government and of civic virtue. For example, in The Republic, Plato places great emphasis on the importance of civic virtue (aiming for the good) together with personal virtue ('just man') on the part of the ideal rulers. In Book V, Plato asserts that until rulers have the nature of philosophers (Socrates) or philosophers become the rulers, there can be no civic peace or happiness.

A number of Ancient Greek city-states such as Athens and Sparta have been classified as "classical republics", because they featured extensive participation by the citizens in legislation and political decision-making. Aristotle considered Carthage to have been a republic as it had a political system similar to that of some of the Greek cities, notably Sparta, but avoided some of the defects that affected them.

=== Ancient Rome ===
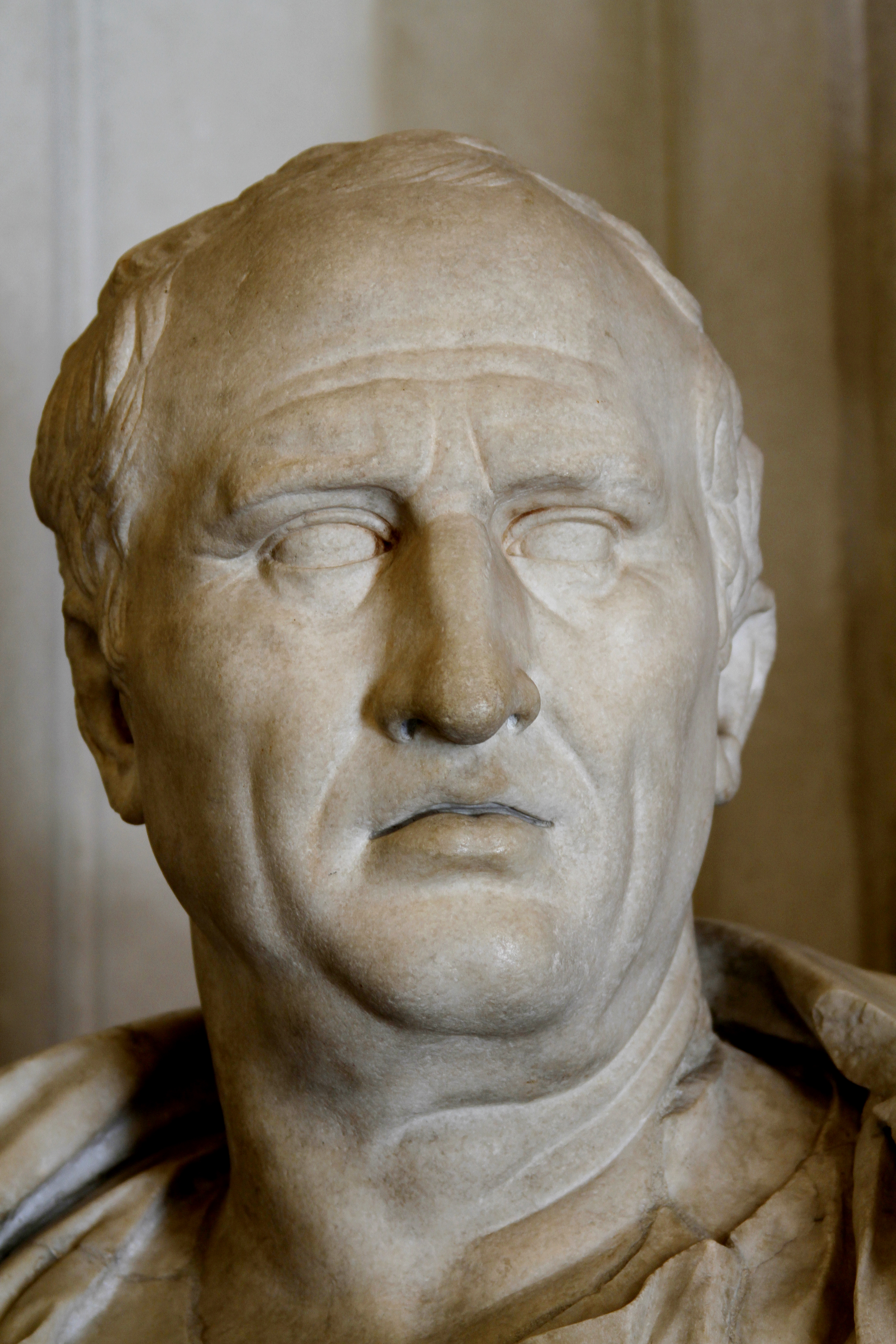
A sculpture of Cicero

Both Livy, a Roman historian, and Plutarch, who is noted for his biographies and moral essays, described how Rome had developed its legislation, notably the transition from a kingdom to a republic, by following the example of the Greeks. Some of this history, composed more than 500 years after the events, with scant written sources to rely on, may be fictitious reconstruction.

The Greek historian Polybius, writing in the mid-2nd century BCE, emphasized (in Book 6) the role played by the Roman Republic as an institutional form in the dramatic rise of Rome's hegemony over the Mediterranean. In his writing on the constitution of the Roman Republic, Polybius described the system as being a "mixed" form of government. Specifically, Polybius described the Roman system as a mixture of monarchy, aristocracy, and democracy with the Roman Republic constituted in such a manner that it applied the strengths of each system to offset the weaknesses of the others.

In his view, the mixed system of the Roman Republic provided the Romans with a much greater level of domestic tranquillity than would have been experienced under another form of government. Polybius argued, the comparative level of domestic tranquillity the Romans enjoyed allowed them to conquer the Mediterranean. Polybius exerted a great influence on Cicero as he wrote his politico-philosophical works in the 1st century BCE. In one of these works, De re publica, Cicero linked the Roman concept of res publica to the Greek politeia.

The modern term "republic", despite its derivation, is not synonymous with the Roman res publica. Among the several meanings of the term res publica, it is most often translated "republic" where the Latin expression refers to the Roman state, and its form of government, between the era of the Kings and the era of the Emperors. This Roman Republic would, by a modern understanding of the word, still be defined as a true republic, even if not coinciding entirely. Thus, Enlightenment philosophers saw the Roman Republic as an ideal system because it included features like a systematic separation of powers.

Romans still called their state "Res Publica" in the era of the early emperors because, on the surface, the organization of the state had been preserved by the first emperors without significant alteration. Several offices from the Republican era, held by individuals, were combined under the control of a single person. These changes became permanent, and gradually conferred sovereignty on the Emperor.

Cicero's description of the ideal state, in De re Publica, does not equate to a modern-day "republic"; it is more like enlightened absolutism. His philosophical works were influential when Enlightenment philosophers such as Voltaire developed their political concepts.

In its classical meaning, a republic was any stable well-governed political community. Both Plato and Aristotle identified three forms of government: democracy, aristocracy, and monarchy. First Plato and Aristotle, and then Polybius and Cicero, held that the ideal republic is a mixture of these three forms of government. The writers of the Renaissance embraced this notion.

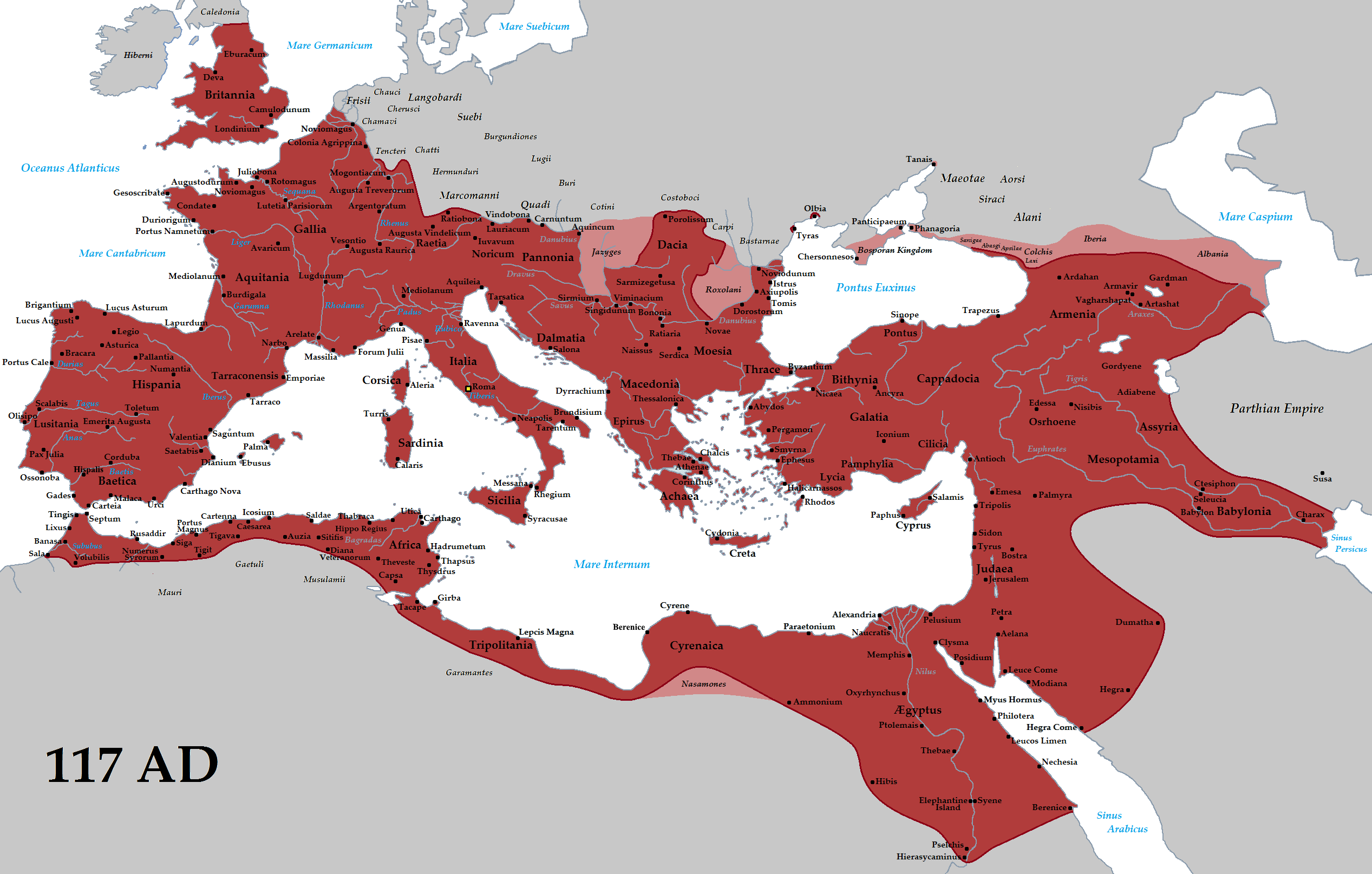
The Roman Empire at its greatest extent in 117 AD under emperor Trajan

Cicero expressed reservations concerning the republican form of government. While in his theoretical works he defended monarchy, or at least a mixed monarchy/oligarchy, his beliefs put him at odds with notable figures such as Julius Caesar, Cleopatra, Mark Antony, and Octavian, who sought to realize such ideals in Rome. Eventually, that opposition led to his death and Cicero can be seen as a victim of his own Republican ideals.

Tacitus, a contemporary of Plutarch, was not concerned with whether a form of government could be analysed as a "republic" or a "monarchy". He analysed how the powers accumulated by the early Julio-Claudian dynasty were all given by a State that was still notionally a republic. Nor was the Roman Republic "forced" to give away these powers: it did so freely and reasonably, certainly in Augustus' case, because of his many services to the state, freeing it from civil wars and disorder.

Tacitus was one of the first to ask whether such powers were given to the head of state because the citizens wanted to give them, or whether they were given for other reasons, for example, because one had a deified ancestor. The latter case led more easily to abuses of power. In Tacitus' opinion, the trend away from a true republic was irreversible only when Tiberius established power, shortly after Augustus' death in 14 CE, much later than most historians place the start of the Imperial form of government in Rome. By this time, too many principles defining some powers as "untouchable" had been implemented.

By AD 211, with Caracalla's edict known as the Constitutio Antoniniana, and although one of the edict's main purposes was to increase tax revenue, all of the empire's free men became citizens with all the rights this entailed. As a result, even after the Fall of the Western Roman Empire, the people who remained within the lands, including Byzantium, that the empire comprised continued to call themselves Rhomaioi. Hellenes had been referring to pagan, or non-Christian, Greeks until the Fourth Crusade.

Through attrition of Byzantine territory in the preceding 400 or so years, from perceived friends and foes alike (Crusaders, Ottoman Turks, and others), Constantinople, the capital of the Byzantine Empire (the Eastern Roman Empire) fell to the Turks led by Mehmed II in 1453. There is a perception that these events led to the predecessor of Greek nationalism through the Ottoman era and even into modern times.

== Religion ==
Greco-Roman mythology, sometimes called classical mythology, is the result of the syncretism between Roman and Greek myths, spanning the period of Great Greece at the end of Roman paganism. Along with philosophy and political theory, mythology is one of the greatest contributions of classical antiquity to Western society.

From a historical point of view, early Christianity was born in the Greco-Roman world, which had a massive influence on Christian culture.

== See also ==
- Classical mythology
- Greco-Roman mysteries
- Greek and Roman Egypt
- Hellenistic Greece
- History of Western civilization before AD 500
- Legacy of the Roman Empire
- List of Greco-Roman geographers
- Magic in the Greco-Roman world
- Greco-Roman relations in classical antiquity

== Sources ==
- Sir William Smith (ed). Dictionary of Greek and Roman Geography. London: Spottiswoode and Co, 1873.
- Simon Hornblower and Antony Spawforth (ed). Oxford Classical Dictionary. Oxford University Press, 2003.
- William Emerton Heitland. Agricola: A Study of Agriculture and Rustic Life in the Greco-Roman World from the Point of View of Labour. Cambridge: University Press, 1921
