= Universal history (genre) =

History of humanity as a whole unit

A universal history is a work aiming at the presentation of a history of all of humankind as a whole. Universal historians try to identify connections and patterns among individual historical events and phenomena, making them part of a general narrative. A universal chronicle or world chronicle typically traces history from the beginning of written information about the past up to the present. Therefore, any work classed as such purportedly attempts to embrace the events of all times and nations insofar as scientific treatment of them is possible.

Siegfried of Ballhausen was the first to use the title Historia universalis (universal history) in 1304.

== Examples ==
=== Ancient examples ===
==== Hebrew Bible ====
A project of Universal history may be seen in the Hebrew Bible, which from the point of view of its redactors in the 5th century BC presents a history of humankind from creation to the Flood, and from there a history of the Israelites down to the present. The Seder Olam is a 2nd-century CE rabbinic interpretation of this chronology.

==== Greco-Roman historiography ====
In Greco-Roman antiquity, the first universal history was written by Ephorus (405–330 BCE). This work has been lost, but its influence can be seen in the ambitions of Polybius (203–120 BC) and Diodorus (fl. 1st century BC) to give comprehensive accounts of their worlds. Herodotus' History is the earliest surviving member of the Greco-Roman world-historical tradition, although under some definitions of universal history it does not qualify as universal because it reflects no attempt to describe an overall direction of history or a principle or set of principles governing or underlying it. Polybius was the first to attempt a universal history in this stricter sense of the term:

For what gives my work its peculiar quality, and what is most remarkable in the present age, is this: Fortune has gained almost all the affairs of the world in one direction and has forced to incline towards one and the same end; a historian should likewise bring before his readers under one synoptic view the operations by which she has accomplished her general purpose (1:4:1-11).

Metamorphoses by Ovid has been considered as a universal history because of its comprehensive chronology—from the creation of humankind to the death of Julius Caesar a year before the poet's birth. In Leipzig are preserved five fragments dating to the 2nd century AD and coming from a world chronicle. Its author is unknown, but was perhaps a Christian. Later, universal history provided an influential lens on the rise of Christianity in the Roman Empire in such works as Eusebius's Ecclesiastical History, Augustine's City of God, and Orosius' History Against the Pagans.

==== Chinese historiography ====
During the Han dynasty (202 BCE – 220 CE) of China, Sima Qian (145–86 BC) was the first Chinese historian to attempt a universal history—from the earliest mythological origins of his civilization to his present day—in his Records of the Grand Historian. Although his generation was the first in China to discover the existence of kingdoms in Central Asia and India, his work did not attempt to cover the history of these regions.

=== Medieval examples ===
==== Asia ====
The 11th-century Zizhi Tongjian of Sima Guang is sometimes considered the first of the chronologically arranged universal histories produced in China.

The 15th-century Indo-Persian Ma'athir-i-Mahmud Shahi, written by 'Abd al-Husayn Tuni (died 1489), is sometimes considered a fragment of a universal history.

==== Christian medieval Europe ====
Graeme Dunphy (2010) described medieval European Christian universal histories as follows:

The key features of the Christian world chronicle, which would be valid throughout the Middle Ages, had therefore become firmly established by late antiquity. The chronicle begins with a divine act of creation and reflects a providential view of history throughout: history is the story of an active God. History is linear and the chronicle is arranged strictly chronologically. There is a sense of decline and decay as the world becomes older, but also a belief in redemption. Though individual events are not always evaluated, there is an underlying assumption that historical facts teach spiritual truths. The patterns of four empires and six ages can be used — but rarely both together — to divide history up into manageable sections.

The medieval universal chronicle thus traces history from the beginning of the world up to the present and was an especially popular genre of historiography in medieval Europe. The universal chronicle differs from the ordinary chronicle in its much broader chronological and geographical scope, giving, in principle, a continuous linear account of the progress of world history from the creation of the world up to the author's own times, but in practice often narrowing down to a more limited geographical range as it approaches those times. They usually have a theological component and are often structured around the ideas of the six ages of the world or the four empires from the Book of Daniel.

According to Kathleen Biddick (2013), universal histories in Christian medieval Europe are 'those medieval histories which take as their subject the theme of salvation history from creation up to the incarnation of Christ (and usually beyond to contemporary events).' She also identified "six or seven ages" into which universal histories were divided.

Less commonly they may use the Augustinian idea of the tension between the heavenly and the earthly state, as depicted in the City of God, which plays a major role in Otto von Freising's Historia de duabus civitatibus. Augustine's thesis depicts the history of the world as universal warfare between God and the Devil. A related idea is the division of history into popes and emperors, which became popular with the success of Martin of Troppau.

In other cases, any obvious theme may be lacking. Some universal chronicles bear a more or less encyclopedic character, with many digressions on non-historical subjects, as is the case with the Chronicon of Helinand of Froidmont. Other notable universal chroniclers of the Medieval West include the Chronicon universale usque ad annum 741, Christherre-Chronik, Helinand of Froidmont (c. 1160—after 1229), Jans der Enikel, Matthew Paris (c. 1200–1259), Ranulf Higdon (c. 1280–1363), Rudolf von Ems, Sigebert of Gembloux (c. 1030–1112), Otto von Freising (c. 1114–1158), and Vincent of Beauvais (c. 1190–1264?). The tradition of universal history can even be seen in the works of medieval historians whose purpose may not have been to chronicle the ancient past, but nonetheless included it in a local history of more recent times. One such example is the History of Gregory of Tours (d. 594), where only the first of his ten books describes creation and ancient history, while the last six books focus on events in his own lifetime and region. While this reading of Gregory is currently a widely accepted hypothesis in historical circles, the central purpose of Gregory's writing is still a topic of hot debate.

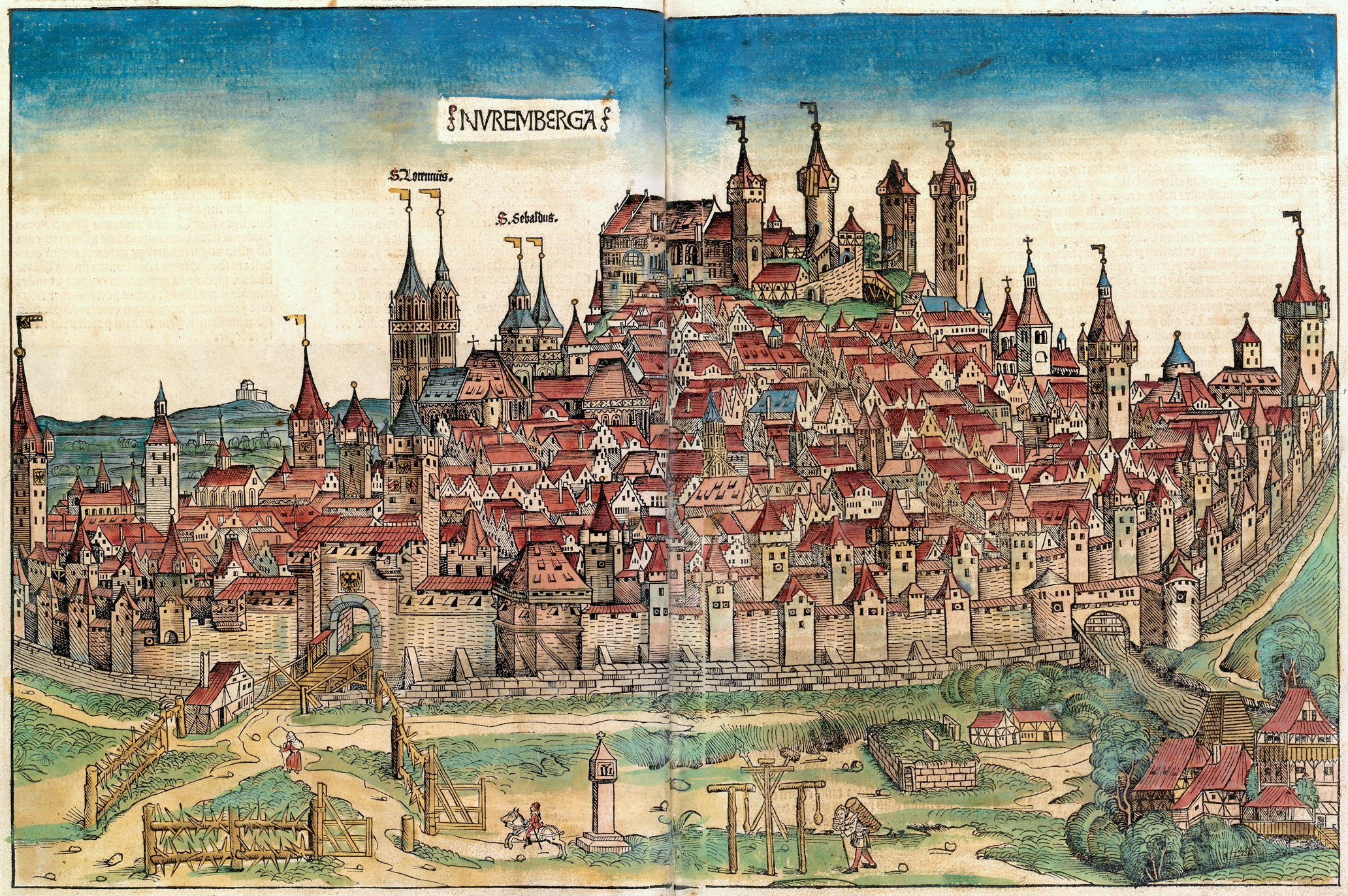
Woodcut city view of Nuremberg in the 1493 Nuremberg Chronicle, one of the earliest printed universal histories. Illustrations featuring mainly city views were popular in European universal chronicles at the time.

The first Christian world chronicle was written in Greek around 221 CE by Julius Africanus, who has been called "the undisputed father of the tradition". The Chronica of Eusebius of Caesarea (c. 275–339) contained in its second book an innovative set of concordance tables (Chronici canones) that for the first time synchronized the several concurrent chronologies in use with different peoples. Eusebius' chronicle became known to the Latin West through the translation by Jerome (c. 347–420). Jerome also wrote a chronicle of his own, and the early chronicles of Isidore of Seville (c. 560–636) and Bede were highly influential, especially Bede's work on chronology. Together, these laid the foundation for the Western universal chronicle tradition.

From around 1100, universal histories increased in graphical complexity, usually adding a mappa mundi ("world map") in which the holy city of Jerusalem was presented as the centre of the world, tying together genealogies and timelines.

The Fasciculus temporum ("Little bundles of time") by Werner Rolevinck was the first printed universal history, published in Cologne in 1474. The Nuremberg Chronicle (1493) was another early printed universal history. By the mid-1480s, when Venetian printers controlled almost half of Europe's incunable production, they heavily promoted the inclusion of illustrations – the majority being city views – in universal chronicles. According to scholars, 32 out of the 52 city views in the Nuremberg Chronicle were "realistic" (depicting towns which really existed, and usually had their own printing presses before 1475), while the remaining 20 city views were "imaginary", and were often reused in later universal chronicles to illustrate different cities. Around this time, the depictions of cities in universal chronicles also shifted away from the earlier focus on Jerusalem (sometimes even illustrated with "imaginary" city views) towards the European cities in which they were produced, thus displacing the centrality of Jerusalem in Christian universal histories.

==== Historiography of early Islam ====
In the medieval Islamic world (13th century), universal history in this vein was taken up by Muslim historians such as Tarikh-i Jahangushay-i Juvaini ("The History of The World Conqueror") by Ala'iddin Ata-Malik Juvayni, Jami' al-tawarikh ("Compendium of Chronicles") by Rashid-al-Din Hamadani (now held at the University of Edinburgh) and the Muqaddimah by Ibn Khaldun.

Universal histories included two forms: the ta'rikh 'ala al-sinin was organised by annual entries and thus annalistic, while the ta'rikh 'ala al-khulafa was organised by the reigns of caliphs. The History of the Prophets and Kings (Tārīkh al-Rusul wa al-Mulūk) of al-Tabari is a prime example of the latter, in which a major role was played for the last time by isnads. An isnad was, ideally, an unbroken chain of transmitters of a hadith (tradition, saying) from the book's compiler back to a witness of the event.

=== Early modern examples ===
A philosophical attempt to work out a universal history according to a natural plan directed to achieving the civic union of the human race must be regarded as possible and, indeed, as contributing to this end of Nature

— Kant – Ninth Thesis

According to Hughes-Warrington (2005), John Knox's 1558 The First Blast of the Trumpet Against the Monstruous Regiment of Women represented 'a universal history of female monarchs'. Knox wrote it in order to argue that women should never be allowed to reign, because that is 'repugnant to nature, contumelious to God, a thing most contrary to his revealed will and approved ordinance, and... the subversion of good order, or all equity and justice.' He was thus writing a history about a particular topic in order to express his view of what the "world order" should be: what the world Knox lived in ought to be like.

An early European project was the Universal History of George Sale and others, written in the mid-18th century.

Christian writers as late as Bossuet in his Discours sur l'histoire universelle (Discourse on Universal History) were still reflecting on and continuing the medieval tradition of universal history.

=== Modern examples ===
In the 19th century, universal histories proliferated. Philosophers such as Kant, Herder, Schiller and Hegel, and political philosophers such as Marx and Herbert Spencer, presented general theories of history that shared essential characteristics with the Biblical account: they conceived of history as a coherent whole, governed by certain basic characteristics or immutable principles. Kant who was one of the earliest thinkers to use the term Universal History described its meaning in "Idea for a Universal History with a Cosmopolitan Purpose":

Whatever concept one may hold...concerning the freedom of the will, certainly its appearances, which are human actions, like every other natural event are determined by universal laws. However obscure their causes, history...permits us to hope that if we attend to the play of freedom of the human will in the large, we may be able to discern a regular movement in it, and that what seems complex and chaotic in the single individual may be seen from the standpoint of the human race as a whole to b a steady and progressive though slow evolution of the original endowment..Each individual and people, as if following some guiding trend, goes toward a natural but to each of them unknown goal...In keeping with this purpose, it might be possible to have a history with a definite natural plan for creatures that have no plan of their own.

Friedrich Schiller, in his inaugural lecture What Is, and to What End do We Study, Universal History? delivered at the University of Jena in 1789, articulated the educational and moral purpose of universal history. Schiller distinguished between the narrow "bread-scholar" who studies merely for practical advantage and the "philosophical mind" that seeks to understand the interconnectedness of all human experience:

The universal historian selects from this totality those events that demonstrably, clearly, and enduringly influenced the present state of the world and the condition of today's generation. The measure is their relevance to the present. Thus, universal history works in the opposite direction to actual chronology: real events unfold from origin to present, but the universal historian starts from the present and moves backwards.

For Schiller, universal history served not merely as an accumulation of facts but as an instrument of human liberation and moral orientation, connecting individual existence to "the enduring chain of humanity."

In the 20th century Austrian academic Ernst Gombrich wrote Eine kurze Weltgeschichte für junge Leser ("A short history of the world for young readers")(1935, pub.1936) in German shortly before fleeing Vienna and settling in Britain. This aimed to be a universal history written using only words and concepts that children could understand. It spans from prehistoric people to World War I. Although it is shaped by its author's European perspective - for example with emphasis on European colonialism - it attempts to cover global human history, taking one region and era at a time, and includes descriptions of the beliefs of many major world religions. Gombrich was convinced that an intelligent child could understand even seemingly complicated ideas in history, if they were put into intelligible terms. After a long delay it was translated into English by Gombrich and his assistant as A Little History of the World, updated slightly. ″With the mingling of peoples on our tiny planet, it becomes more and more necessary for us to respect and tolerate each other, not least because technological advances are bringing us closer and closer together.″

In 2010, historian David Christian advocated for the restoration of universal history which involves combining human history with that of biology, geology and cosmology. He saw the accumulation of empirical research and the progress made in scientific dating as key foundations for this method.

== Literature cited ==
- Biddick, Kathleen (2013). The Typological Imaginary: Circumcision, Technology, History. Philadelphia: University of Pennsylvania Press. p. 160. ISBN 9780812201277.
- Borst, Arno (1991) [1988]. Medieval Worlds: Barbarians, Heretics and Artists in the Middle Ages. Translated by Eric Hansen. University of Chicago Press.
- Bossuet, Jacques Bénigne (1810). An universal history: from the beginning of the world, to the Empire of Charlemagne. Translated by Elphinston, James. R. Moore.
- Dunphy, Graeme (2010). "World Chronicles". In Dunphy, Graeme (ed.). Encyclopedia of the Medieval Chronicle. Leiden: Brill. pp. 1527–1532.
- Halmi Nicholas and Borowski Audrey, Nicholas Halmi (2023). "Universal Histories". Intellectual History Review, 33:3. Vol. 33. Oxford: Taylor and Francis. pp. 367–523. doi:10.1080/17496977.2023.2180590.
- Halmi, Nicholas (2023). "Universal Histories - an Introduction". In Halmi Nicholas, Borowski Audrey (ed.). Intellectual History Review. Vol. 33. Oxford: Taylor and Francis. pp. 367–374. doi:10.1080/17496977.2023.2180590.
- Harding, Anne Raikes (1848). An epitome of universal history from the earliest period to the revolutions of 1848. London: Longman.
- Hughes-Warrington, Marnie (2005). Palgrave Advances in World Histories. New York: Palgrave MacMillan. p. 286. ISBN 9780230523401.
- Lamprecht, Karl (1905). What is history? Five lectures on the modern science of history. E. A. Andrews (trans.), William Edward Dodd (trans.). New York: Macmillan Co. pp. 181–227. OCLC 1169422.
- Mitchell, Kathleen; Wood, Ian (2002). The World of Gregory of Tours. Boston: Brill.
- Ploetz, Carl (1883). Epitome of ancient, mediaeval and modern history.
- Ranke, Leopold von (1884). Universal history: the oldest historical group of nations and the Greeks. Scribner.
- Solodow, Joseph B. (1988). The World of Ovid's Metamorphoses. Chapel Hill: University of North Carolina Press. ISBN 9780807817711.
- Wood, Ian (1994). Gregory of Tours. Bangor: Headstart History.
