= Universal History (Sale et al) =

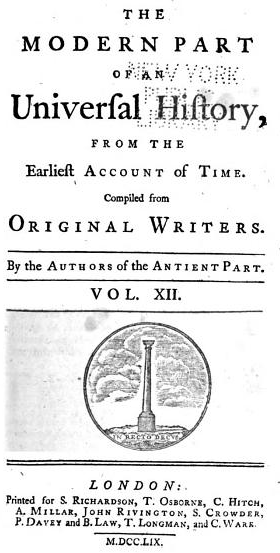
Universal History, v.12, 1759

The Universal History (complete title: An Universal history, from the earliest account of time. Compiled from original authors; and illustrated with maps, cuts, notes, &c. With a general index to the whole.) was a 65-volume universal history of the world published in London between 1747 and 1768. Contributors included George Sale, George Psalmanazar, Archibald Bower, George Shelvocke, John Campbell and John Swinton. The novelist Tobias Smollett edited for a short period.

It was one of the first works to attempt to unify the history of Western Europe with the stories of the known world. As a major historical synthesis on, among other subjects, European colonial activities during the modern era, the Modern Part of an Universal History (1754–65) can be considered, according to one specialist, Guido Abbattista, as a precursor of Guillaume Raynal's Histoire des deux Indes (1770–80), of which it was one of the most important, even if not acknowledged, sources.
