= Leipziger Weltchronik =

The Leipziger Weltchronik (German for World chronicle of Leipzig) is preserved in five papyrus fragments in the Papyrus Collection in Leipzig. The fragments were bought in 1913, but were only published in 2010. The chronicle dates to the first half of the 2nd century AD. These are the earliest known fragments of a world chronicle. On the badly preserved fragments events on the founding of Thebes (Boeotia) and a list of Babylonian and Egyptian kings are preserved. Hesiod is named. The chronicle is perhaps Christian.

The following events are preserved in the four remaining columns:

- column I: The legend of the founding of Thebes (P.Lips. Inv. 1229).
- column II: heavily damaged, Hesiod and the Ionians are mentioned, there appears the year 772 BC. (P.Lips. Inv. 1232 + P.Lips. Inv. 1231, Kol. I)
- column III: Babylonian kings are mentioned, the Pythian Games and there is a list of Egyptian kings (P.Lips. Inv. 1231, Kol. II + P.Lips. Inv. 590, Kol. I + P.Lips. Inv. 1228, Kol. II)

Smende[s ...],
[...]mompsames: 51 years [...]
[..., x years], Amenophris: [x] years [...]
Ous[e]rthos: 11 years ,
Psossam[m]eos: [x years ],
S[...]ites: 1 year, Ouse[r]tho[s]: [x years (?)],
one further S[...]tes [: x years ...].
[...]os:35[x years. ..]
his son: 75 (?) years.
Ous[er]th[os]: 24 years.
Se[s]yngkheis: 14 years.
So[k]ophtheis: 3 years.
Amendesis: 11 years.
Sesongchis: 41 <years>.
Ousorthos: 40[+x] years.

- column IV: list of Egyptian kings (P.Lips. Inv. 590, Kol. II)

Medes 48 years,
Psonsame[s] [x+]1 years,
Amoses 14 years,
Amenophis 9 years,
Ouertho[...] 20 (years?)
Ou[e]rtho[s ...] [x] years,
Sesyngch[eis x yea]rs,
Syphois [x yea]rs,
Zmendas [x yea]rs,
Ouserthos [x yea]rs,
Psonsame[s] [x yea]rs

== Literature ==
- Daniela Colomo, Lutz Popko, Michaela Rücker, Reinhold Scholl: Die älteste Weltchronik, Europa, die Sintflut und das Lamm, In: Archiv für Papyrusforschung 56/1, 2010, p. 1-25
- Alexander Weiß: Die Leipziger Weltchronik – die älteste christliche Weltchronik?, In: Archiv für Papyrusforschung 56/1, 2010, p. 26-37
