= John Swinton (clergyman, born 1703) =

British writer, academic and clergyman

The Reverend John Swinton FRS
- Born: 1703; England
- Died: 4 April 1777 (aged 73–74)
- Education: Wadham College, Oxford (MA)

John Swinton (1703 – 4 April 1777) was a British writer, academic, Fellow of the Royal Society, Church of England clergyman and orientalist. In 1731, he was a fellow of Wadham College, Oxford, but migrated to Christ Church in 1745. He contributed to George Sale's Universal History. Swinton also contributed articles on the transcription of the 'Ruins of Palmyra'. Beginning in 1749, Swinton donated a number of Roman coins to the collection at Christ Church. From 1767 until the year of his death he was Keeper of the Archives at Oxford University.

== Life ==
The son of John Swinton of Bexton in Cheshire, he was born in the county. He entered Wadham College, Oxford as a servitor, matriculating on 10 October 1719, and on 30 June 1723 he was elected a scholar. He graduated B.A. on 1 December 1723, and proceeded M.A. on 1 December 1726.

Swinton was ordained deacon on 30 May 1725 and priest on 28 May 1727; and in February 1728 he was instituted into the rectory of St Peter-le-Bailey, Oxford. On 16 October 1728, he was elected a Fellow of the Royal Society, and on 30 June 1729 was chosen a probationer-fellow of Wadham. He then accepted the position of chaplain to the English factory at Livorno, went to Florence in 1733, and returned to England after visiting Venice, Vienna, and Pressburg. He then took up his abode in Oxford, where he resided till 1743, when he was appointed a prebendary of St. Asaph Cathedral on 11 October, resigning his fellowship at the same time.

In July 1745, Swinton migrated to Christ Church and in 1759 proceeded B.D. He was elected keeper of the archives of the university in 1767, and, dying on 4 April 1777, was buried in the antechapel of Wadham. He was married, but left no children. His wife, who died in 1784, was also buried in Wadham chapel.

== Works ==
Swinton published:

- De Linguæ Etruriæ Regalis Vernacula Dissertatio, Oxford, 1738.
- A Critical Essay concerning the Words Δαιμων and Δαιμονιον, London, 1739.
- De priscis Romanorum literis Dissertatio, Oxford, 1746.
- Inscriptiones Citieæ, Oxford, 1750.
- De nummis quibusdam Samaritanis et Phœniciis, 1750.
- Metilia, Oxford, 1750.

Swinton also contributed dissertations to the Philosophical Transactions of the Royal Society (1761–74); "An Explication of All the Inscriptions in the Palmyrene Language and Character Hitherto Publish'd. In Five Letters from the Reverend Mr. John Swinton, M. A. of Christ-Church, Oxford, and F. R. S. to the Reverend Thomas Birch, D. D. Secret. R. S." had been communicated to Philosophical Transactions in 1753. He was the author of portions of George Sale's Universal History. "The Travels of three English Gentlemen, from Venice to Hamburgh" appeared in The Harleian Miscellany, Oxford, 1734.
