= Anne Raikes Harding =

English writer

- Born: Anne Raikes Orchard; 5 March 1779; Bath, England
- Died: 28 April 1858 (aged 79)
- Occupation: Writer
- Writing career
- Language: English
- Genre: Fiction

Anne Raikes Harding, née Orchard (5 March 1781 – 28 April 1858) was an English novelist and miscellaneous writer.

Harding was born on 5 March 1781 in Bath. She married Thomas Harding but he died intestate in 1805, leaving her to raise their three children. She ran a school and worked as a governess while writing her novels.

Harding published all her writing anonymously. As well as her novels, she wrote An Epitome of Universal History (London, 1848), Sketches of the Highlands (1832), and Little Sermons (1840). She also contributed to reviews and periodicals.

She died on 28 April 1858, at the house of her son-in-law, the Rev. William Kynaston Groves.

== Works ==
- Correction, 3 vols., 1818.
- Decision, 3 vols., 1819.
- The Refugees, 3 vols., 1822.
- Realities, 4 vols., 1825.
- Dissipation, 4 vols., 1827.
- Experience, 4 vols., 1828.
