= George Sale =

English Orientalist scholar (1697–1736)

George Sale (1697–1736) was an English Orientalist scholar and practising solicitor, best known for his 1734 translation of the Quran into English. In 1748, after having read Sale's translation, Voltaire wrote his own essay "De l'Alcoran et de Mahomet" ("On the Quran and on Mohammed").

Sale supplied "Articles relating to Oriental History" to A General Dictionary, Historical and Critical, an English translation and enlargement of Pierre Bayle's Dictionnaire historique et critique, .

== Biography ==
Born in Canterbury, Kent, Sale was educated at the King's School, Canterbury, and in 1720 became a student of the Inner Temple. It is known that he trained as a solicitor in his early years but took time off from his legal pursuits, returning at need to his profession. Sale was an early member of the Society for Promoting Christian Knowledge.

He became seriously ill with fever for eight days before his death. George Sale died at Surrey Street, Strand, London, on 13 November 1736 and was buried at St Clement Danes in London. His family consisted of a wife and five children.

== Alcoran of Mohammed ==
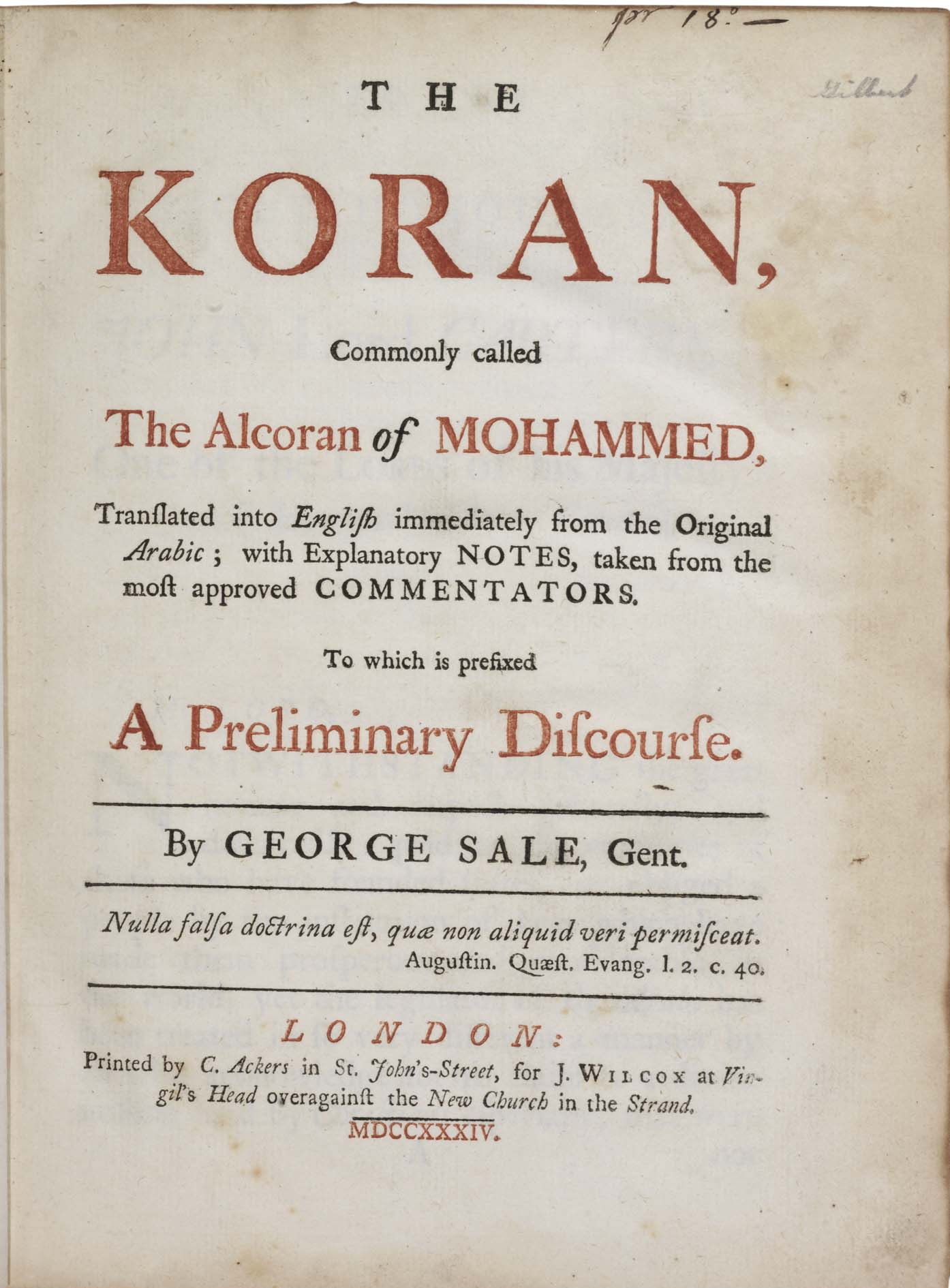
Title page of a first edition of Sale's translation

In 1734, Sale published a translation of the Quran, The Koran: Commonly called The Alcoran of Mohammed, dedicated to John Carteret, 2nd Earl Granville. Relying heavily on O.M.D. Louis Maracci's Arabic edition and Latin translation, Sale provided numerous notes and a Preliminary discourse. Sale had access to the Dutch Church, Austin Friars' 14th-century manuscript of al-Baydāwī's Lights of Revelation and the Secrets of Interpretation, and this seems the source for his Arabic Quran rather than his own personal Quran, catalogued MS Sale 76 in the Bodleian Library.

Sale's footnotes provide the literal translation where it differs from the idiom of the body text; he gives alternate variant readings; and supplementary historical and contextual information. Sir Edward Denison Ross added the Introduction to the 1922 reprint of Sale's translation.

=== Preliminary discourse ===
Though he did not place Islam at an equal level with Christianity, Sale seemed to view Mohammad as a conqueror who sought to destroy idolatry and a lawgiver who managed to change and supplant many practices in Arabia:

The remembrance of the calamities brought on so many nations by the conquests of the Arabians may possibly raise some indignation against him who formed them to empire, but this being equally applicable to all conquerors, could not, of itself, occasion all the detestation with which the name Mohammed is loaded. He has given a new system of religion, which has had still greater success than the arms of his followers, and to establish this religion made use of an imposture, and on this account it is supposed that he must of necessity have been a most abandoned villain, and his memory is become infamous. But as Mohammed gave his Arabs the best religion he could, as well as the best laws, preferable, at least, to those of the ancient pagan lawgivers, I confess I cannot see why he deserves not equal respect, though not with Moses or Jesus Christ, whose laws came really from heaven, yet with Minos or Numa, notwithstanding the distinction of a learned writer, who seems to think it a greater crime to make use of an imposture to set up a new religion, founded on the acknowledgment of one true God, and to destroy idolatry, than to use the same means to gain reception to rules and regulations for the more orderly practice of heathenism already established.

Sale prefixed a Preliminary Discourse to his translation covering topics including Arabs "before hijrah"; the State of the Eastern Churches, and Judaism, at time of Mohammed; the Peculiarities of the Quran; positive and negative Doctrines and Instructions of the Quran; and political Islam in the 1730s.

Sale posits the decline of the Persian Empire on rivalry between the sects of Manes and Mazdak, and mass immigration into Arabia to escape persecution in the Grecian empire. In his eighth essay on False Prophecy, Sale notes Muslim Sects both Canonical (Maleci, Hanefites, Hanbali and Shafi‘i) and "heretical" (Shi'ism).

== Other works ==
Sale was also a corrector of the Arabic version of the New Testament (1726) issued by the Society for Promoting Christian Knowledge. He acquired a library with valuable rare manuscripts of Persian, Ottoman Turkish, and Arabic origins, which is now held in the Bodleian Library, Oxford.

He assisted in the writing of the Universal History published in London from 1747 to 1768. When the plan of universal history was arranged, Sale was one of those who were selected to carry it into execution. Sale wrote the chapter, "The Introduction, containing the Cosmogony, or Creation of the World". Critics of the time accused Sale of having a view which was hostile to tradition and the Scriptures. They attacked his account of cosmogony as having a view giving currency to heretical opinions.

His books:

- The Koran, First Edition, 1734. (ed. high resolution scans from the Posner Memorial Collection.)
- George Sale (Translator) and Claude Etienne Savary (illustrator), "The Koran: Commonly Called the Alcoran of Mohammed". J.W. Moore, 1856. 670 pages
- George Sale, et al., "Sacred Books of the East: With Critical and Biographical Sketches". Colonial Press, 1900. 457 pages
- Sale, George, Bower, Archibald and Psalmanazar, George; An Universal History, from the Earliest Account of Time. Millar, 1747.
- George Sale, "Selections from the Koran of Mohammed". Priv. print. by N.H. Dole, 1904. 211 pages.
- George Sale, et al., "Arabic Reading Lessons: Consisting of Easy Extracts from the Best Authors". Wm. H. Allen, 1864. 103 pages.

== Legacy ==
In 1760 the Radcliffe Library, Oxford acquired his collection of mainly 13th- to 18th-century Persian and Arabic manuscripts, mostly poetry and belles-lettres. They were transferred to the Bodleian Library in 1872. Richard Alfred Davenport wrote his biography. Works included in Sales library include Ibn Khallikān’s Wafayāt al-ayān (MSS Sale 48–49); selection of hadith (MS Sale 70); collections of the stories of saints and martyrs (MS Sale 77–78); the sayings of Alī (MS Sale 82); biographies of Shi'ite, Majālis al-mu'minīn by Nūr Allāh b.'Abd Allāh Shushtarī (MS Sale 68); instructions on use of the Quran for divination (MS Sale 69), and a treatise on the merits of visiting the Prophet's grave (MS Sale 56).

Sale's translation of the Quran has been reprinted into modern times. In January 2007, Keith Ellison, the first Muslim elected to the United States Congress, was sworn in using a 1764 edition of Sale's translation of the Quran, sold to the Library of Congress in 1815 by Thomas Jefferson. In January 2019 newly elected Congresswomen Rashida Tlaib and Ilhan Omar were sworn in using the same edition of Sale's translation.
