= A Yankee in Canada, with Anti-Slavery and Reform Papers =

A Yankee in Canada, with Anti-Slavery and Reform Papers is an anthology of works by Henry David Thoreau, edited by his sister Sophia Thoreau and his friends William Ellery Channing and Ralph Waldo Emerson. It was published in 1866, after Thoreau’s death, by Ticknor and Fields, the Boston firm that had published Walden.

== “A Yankee in Canada” ==
In the first essay, “A Yankee in Canada,” Thoreau writes about his journey to the region of Montreal and Quebec City in the Fall of 1850. The essay comprises five chapters, three of which were previously published in 1853 in Putnam’s Magazine under the title “An Excursion to Canada.” (Thoreau withheld the remaining two chapters following an editorial dispute with George William Curtis, his editor at the magazine.)

== The other essays in the anthology ==
- "Slavery in Massachusetts": An address given in Framingham, MA, on July 4, 1852, which Thoreau composed from material from his journals, and later published the abolitionist newspaper The Liberator in July 1854.
- "Prayers": An essay by Emerson, not Thoreau, first published in The Dial in 1842, and containing a 14-line prayer in verse form written by Thoreau. In a note to The complete works of Ralph Waldo Emerson (Houghton Mifflin, 1904), Edward Emerson wrote "It is thought by a friend of the Thoreau family that the prayers preceding and following [Henry David Thoreau's poem] were written by his loved brother John, who had died a few months before the publication of this paper."
- "Civil Disobedience": Presented as a lecture at the Concord Lyceum in 1848 and first published in 1849 under the title "Resistance to Civil Government,” in Æsthetic Papers, edited by Elizabeth Peabody. A Yankee in Canada, with Anti-Slavery and Reform Papers was the first publication in which this essay appeared under the title "Civil Disobedience."
- "A Plea for Captain John Brown": Presented as an address at the First Parish Meetinghouse in Concord, MA, on October 30, 1859, and published in 1860 in Echoes of Harper's Ferry, edited by James Redpath
- "Paradise (to be) Regained": Thoreau’s review of John Adolphus Etzler’s utopian treatise, The Paradise Within the Reach of All Men. Thoreau’s review was first published in The United States Magazine and Democratic Review in November 1843.
- "Herald of Freedom": A review of the New Hampshire-based abolitionist periodical Herald of Freedom. Thoreau’s article was first published in The Dial in April 1844, and he revised it for republication in 1846 as a memorial to its editor, Nathaniel Peabody Rogers. In a 1949 paper in The New England Quarterly, Wendell P. Glick wrote “Thoreau apparently felt that the Herald of Freedom exemplified the proper attitude of the transcendentalist toward the corrupt institutions about him.”
- "Thomas Carlyle and his Works": Thoreau biographer Walter Harding calls this “Thoreau’s one extended piece of literary criticism.” He worked on the Thomas Carlyle essay in 1845 while living at Walden Pond, and published it in March 1847 in Graham's Magazine.
- "Life without Principle": In the mid-1850s, Thoreau gave several Lyceum readings of this text under the title "What Shall It Profit." He later edited it for publication, but died before it made its first appearance in print in The Atlantic Monthly, with its present title, in October 1863.
- "Wendell Phillips before the Concord Lyceum": Written as an anonymous letter dated March 12, 1845, to the editor of The Liberator and published there in March, 1845, this essay supports the arguments of abolitionist spokesman Wendell Phillips, and defends his right to address the Concord Lyceum. Phillips was the source of much controversy in Concord, where two curators of the Lyceum, Rev. Barzillai Frost and John Shepard Keyes, resigned in protest when he was invited to speak.
- "The Last Days of John Brown": An essay delivered as a speech on July 4, 1860, and first published in July, 1860, in The Liberator. As he did in "A Plea for Captain John Brown," Thoreau examined the moral dilemma of those who at first “were ready to say [...] that [Brown] ought to be hung," but at last were convinced that “[a]ll whose moral sense had been aroused [...] sided with him.”
