= Sage writing =

Victorian-era genre of creative nonfiction

Sage writing was a genre of creative nonfiction popular in the Victorian era. The concept originates with John Holloway's 1953 book The Victorian Sage: Studies in Argument.

Sage writing is a development from ancient wisdom literature in which the writer chastises and instructs the reader about contemporary social issues, often utilising discourses of philosophy, history, politics, and economics in non-technical ways. Prominent examples of the genre include writings by Thomas Carlyle, Matthew Arnold, John Ruskin, and Henry David Thoreau. Some 20th-century writers, such as Joan Didion and New Journalists such as Norman Mailer and Tom Wolfe, have also been identified as sage writers.

== Characteristic traits ==
Holloway constructed the concept of sage writing as a means to rediscover the value of Victorian writers, who had been denigrated by Modernists for their prolixity and moralizing. He wrote "No one, of course, is suggesting that Victorian 'prophetic' literature is an all-sufficing treasury of forgotten wisdom. But by now we can see that the Victorian prophets deserve not embarrassed disregard, but respect and thoughtful attention."

Holloway identified Thomas Carlyle as the originator of the genre, but traced its origins back to Samuel Taylor Coleridge. He argued that Carlyle "wants to state, and to clinch, the basic tenets of a 'Life-Philosophy', of something that will veritably transform men's outlook". Carlyle established a model whereby the writer makes non-logical arguments about contemporary social issues, drawing from various forms of modern knowledge and traditional wisdom.

According to George Landow, who developed Holloway's model, sage writing can be distinguished from traditional wisdom literature in that "Whereas the pronouncements of traditional wisdom literature always take as their point of departure the assumption that they embody the accepted, received wisdom of an entire society, the pronouncements of the biblical prophet and Victorian sage begin with the assumption that, however traditional their messages may once have been, they are now forgotten or actively opposed by society." The sage borrows from the Old Testament prophets what Landow identifies as a four-part strategy of "interpretation, attack upon the audience (or those in authority), warning, and visionary promise."

== Influences ==
Sage writing is a development of wisdom literature drawing much of its energy from the style of Old Testament prophets such as Jeremiah and Isaiah; notably, sage writer Matthew Arnold was once referred to as an "Elegant Jeremiah". Landow also lists sermon writing, satire, and British and German Romantic poetry as formative influences.

== Major sage texts ==
- Thomas Carlyle - "Signs of the Times" (1829); Past and Present (1843); Latter-Day Pamphlets (1850)
- Matthew Arnold - Culture and Anarchy (1869)
- John Ruskin - The Stones of Venice (1851–3); Unto this Last (1860)
- Henry David Thoreau - "Life Without Principle"; (1854); "Slavery in Massachusetts" (1854); "A Plea for Captain John Brown" (1859)
- C P Snow - The Two Cultures (1959)
- Norman Mailer - The Armies of the Night (1968)
- Joan Didion - Slouching Towards Bethlehem (1968)
