= Henry Higginson House =

Historic house in Massachusetts, United States

- U.S. National Register of Historic Places
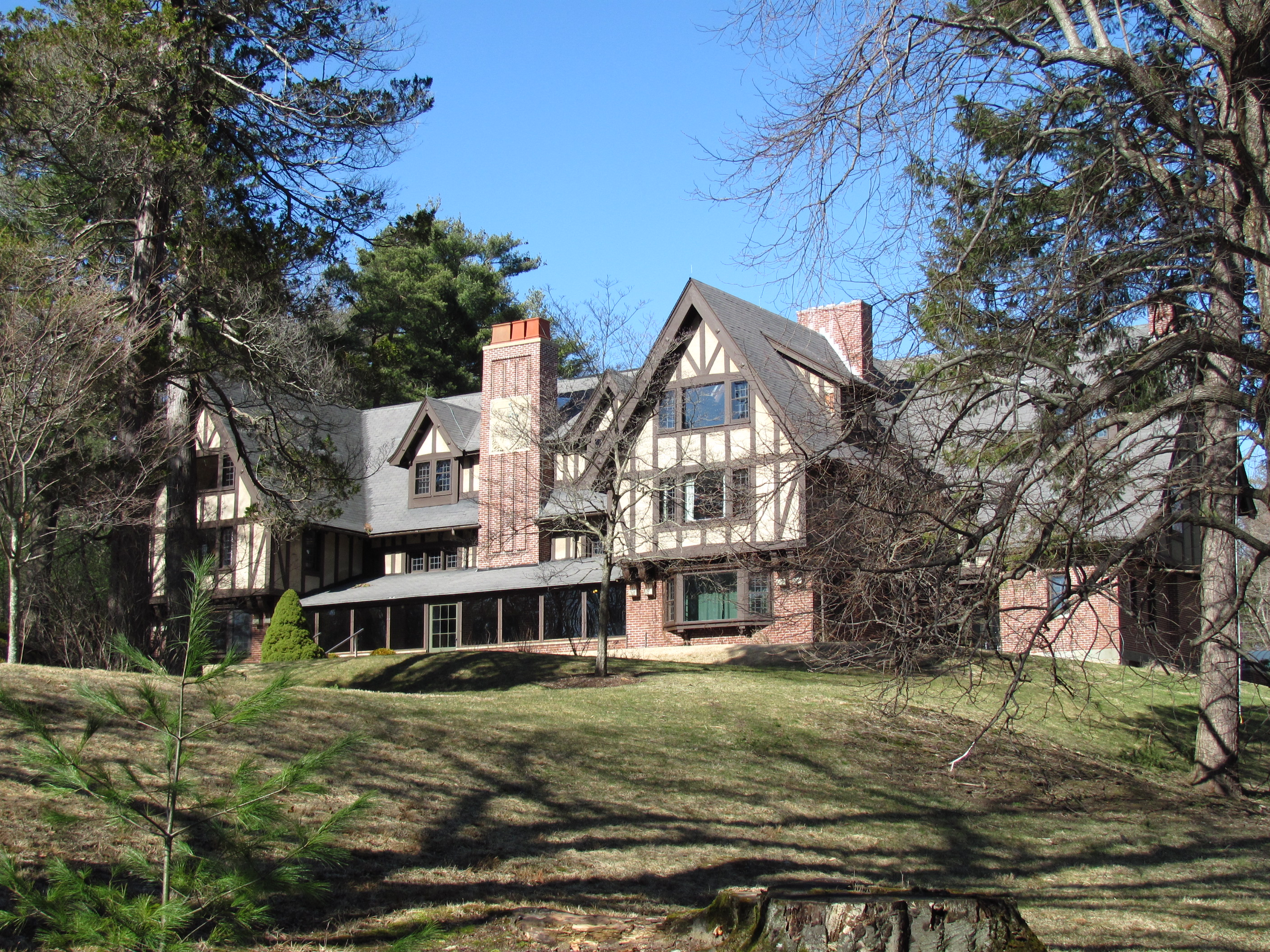
- Henry Higginson House

- Location within Massachusetts
- Location: Lincoln, Massachusetts
- Coordinates: 42°26′3″N 71°19′42″W
- Area: 5.18 acres (2.10 ha)
- Built: 1905
- Architect: Chamberlain, Julian Ingersoll
- Architectural style: Tudor Revival
- NRHP reference No.: 05000468
- Added to NRHP: May 26, 2005

The Henry Higginson House is a historic house located at 44 Baker Farm Road in Lincoln, Massachusetts.

== Description and history ==
The three-story Tudor Revival mansion was designed by Julian Ingersoll Chamberlain and built in 1905-06 for Alexander Henry Higginson. It was paid for by Higginson's father, Henry Lee Higginson. It was part of a much larger gentleman's estate that encompassed a significant portion of lands south of Walden Pond, land that was described by Henry David Thoreau as part of Jacob Baker's farm. Higginson lived there until 1933. The house remained in private ownership until 1992, when it was purchased by the Walden Woods Project, dedicated to the preservation of the Walden Woods area.

The house was listed on the National Register of Historic Places on May 26, 2005.

== See also ==
- Thoreau Society, whose library is housed here
- National Register of Historic Places listings in Middlesex County, Massachusetts
