= Reform and the Reformers =

Essay written by Henry David Thoreau

"Reform and the Reformers" is an essay written by Henry David Thoreau. The essay was never published in his lifetime, and has been cobbled together from existing lecture notes that Thoreau himself picked over for his other writings, such as Walden and A Week on the Concord and Merrimack Rivers.

The essay reflects Thoreau's frustration with the multitude of reformers – prohibitionists, utopian communists, free love advocates, religious revivalists, and the like – who were roaming about New England at the time hawking their prescriptions for a better world.

Thoreau's audience in Boston were of the open-minded liberal variety – people who were typically the most interested in and the most vulnerable to the charms of these reformers – and so Thoreau begins his lecture slyly with a fairly superficial but probably sympathetic attack on the Reformer's great enemy: the Conservative. Further disarming his audience with a witticism or two, he then turns on them by spending the rest of the lecture attacking the major genre of lecturers that they more typically come to hear: the Reformer.

His major complaint is much the same as the one he expressed when reviewing John Etzler's technological utopianism (see Paradise (to be) Regained) – that the utopianists, and Reformers in general, are too concerned with exerting control over and reshaping The World, or Society, or The Government, or The Family, and not concerned enough about better using the control they already exercise over themselves:

The Reformer who comes recommending any institution or system to the adoption of men, must not rely solely on logic and argument, or on eloquence and oratory for his success, but see that he represents one pretty perfect institution in himself, the center and circumference of all others, an erect man. I ask of all Reformers, of all who are recommending Temperance, Justice, Charity, Peace, the Family, Community or Associative life, not to give us their theory and wisdom only, for these are no proof, but to carry around with them each a small specimen of his own manufactures, and to despair of ever recommending anything of which a small sample at least cannot be exhibited: – that the Temperance man let me know the savor of Temperance, if it be good, the Just man permit to enjoy the blessings of liberty while with him, the Community man allow me to taste the sweets of the Community life in his society.

He suspects that these Reformers are acting from some subconscious motive (or, using less psychoanalytic terms: "some obscure, and perhaps unrecognized private grievance") that is overtly philanthropic, but covertly a scheme for avoiding the real necessity for self-reform.

He reminds the Reformers that they speak with their deeds more than with their words – that if "the lecturer against the use of money is paid for his lecture, … that is the precept which [men] hear and believe, and they have a great deal of sympathy with him" – and noting that it's easy to lecture about "non-resistance" but the proof of the pudding is when "one Mr. Resistance" steps forward to take part in the debate.

He notes:

For the most part by simply agreeing in opinion with the preacher and Reformer I defend myself and get rid of him, for he really asks for no sympathy with deeds – and this trick it would be well for the irritable Conservative to know and practice.

So he recommends that Reformers, and those interested in Reform, instead work on themselves. He anticipates the objection that would invert his argument by saying that he is recommending a narcissistic evasion of responsibility for grappling with social problems. The problems of the social order, of the political order, of the family, and so on, Thoreau insists, are rooted in individuals – the corrupt institutions are only the symptom:

The disease and disorder in society are wont to be referred to the false relations in which men live one to another, but strictly speaking there can be no such thing as a false relation if the condition of the things related is true. False relations grow out of false conditions.

== Sources ==
- The Writings of Henry David Thoreau: Reform Papers, Princeton University Press, 1973 (ISBN 0-691-06241-2)
- The Higher Law: Thoreau on Civil Disobedience and Reform, Princeton University Press, 2004 (ISBN 978-0691118765)
- My Thoughts are Murder to the State, CreateSpace Independent Publishing Platform, 2007 (ISBN 978-1434804266)
