= Excursions (anthology) =

Excursions is an 1863 anthology of several essays by American transcendentalist Henry David Thoreau. The anthology contains an introduction entitled "Biographical Sketch" in which fellow transcendentalist Ralph Waldo Emerson provides a description of Thoreau.

The book, other than R. W. Emerson's biography of Thoreau, contains nine of Thoreau's essays: Natural History of Massachusetts, A Walk to Wachusett, The Landlord, A Winter Walk, The Succession of Forest Trees, Walking, Autumnal Tints, Wild Apples, and Night and Moonlight.
