= Thoreau Society =

Literary society devoted to Henry David Thoreau

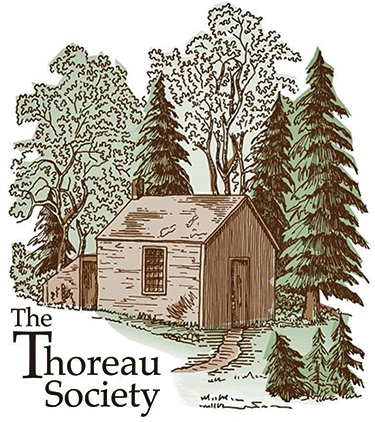
Founded in 1941, the Thoreau Society is the oldest and largest organization devoted to an American author.

The Thoreau Society is an organization dedicated to American writer Henry David Thoreau. Founded in 1941, it is the oldest and largest organization dedicated to an American author. It is based in Concord, Massachusetts, United States, at the Wheeler-Minot Farmhouse where Thoreau was born in 1817. With members from all 50 states and countries around the world, the Society disseminates knowledge about Thoreau by collecting books, manuscripts, and artifacts relating to Thoreau and his contemporaries, by encouraging the use of its extensive collections, and by publishing two periodicals, the Thoreau Society Bulletin and the Concord Saunterer.

The Thoreau Society archives are housed at the Walden Woods Project's Thoreau Institute Library in Lincoln, Massachusetts. This repository includes the collections of Walter Harding and Raymond Adams, two of the foremost authorities on Thoreau and founders of the Thoreau Society; and those of Roland W. Robbins, who uncovered Thoreau's Walden house site.

== Mission ==
- To stimulate interest in and foster education about Thoreau's life, works, and philosophy and his place in his world and ours,
- To encourage research on Thoreau's life and writings,
- To act as a repository for Thoreauviana and material relevant to Thoreau,
- And to advocate for the preservation of Thoreau Country.

== Members ==
Thoreau Society members represent a broad range of professions, interests, and hometowns across the United States and around the world. They are connected by the conviction that Thoreau had important things to say and crucial questions to ask that are just as significant now as in Thoreau's lifetime.

Through its programs, publications and projects, The Thoreau Society is committed to preserving Thoreau's legacy and encouraging people to think about how they live their lives.

== Activities ==
The society hosts educational programs, including lectures, classes, and performances in Thoreau's hometown of Concord, often in collaboration with other historical, literary, environmental and educational organizations. They also offer trips to places associated with Thoreau, from half-day hikes to multi-day outings. Past locations have included Mount Katahdin, Cape Cod, Harpers Ferry, Mount Monadnock and Concord sites such as Egg Rock, Fairhaven Bay, Gowing's Swamp and Sleepy Hollow Cemetery.

The society hosts annual sessions devoted to Thoreau at academic conferences hosted by the Modern Language Association and the American Literature Association. They also provide workshops for educators and the general public in Concord and beyond. Coordinated by members, other Thoreau Society projects and events take place in communities across the country and around the world.

Among their largest offerings is the Annual Gathering. This event provides four days of indoor and outdoor sessions and excursions in and around Concord focused on a different theme each year. The Thursday–Sunday program is scheduled in early July.

== Publications ==
=== Thoreau Society Bulletin ===
A quarterly publication with Society news, additions to the Thoreau bibliography, and short articles on Thoreau and related topics. Edited by Brent Ranalli.

=== Concord Saunterer ===
An annual scholarly journal featuring in-depth essays on Thoreau, his times and his contemporaries, and his influence today. Edited by John J. Kucich.

=== Books ===
The Society publishes and sponsors the publication of original Thoreau-related books and reprints of selected hard-to-find titles about Thoreau.

=== The collections ===
The Thoreau Society owns several important collections, including the papers of Walter Harding, Raymond Adams, and Roland Robbins, which are housed at the Thoreau Institute at Walden Woods. This research facility, founded through a collaboration between the Walden Woods Project and The Thoreau Society, is managed by the Walden Woods Project.
