= Sir Walter Raleigh (essay) =

Reconstructed essay by Henry David Thoreau

"Sir Walter Raleigh" is an essay by Henry David Thoreau that has been reconstructed from notes he wrote for an 1843 lecture and drafts of an article he was preparing for The Dial.

It was first published in 1950, in a collection of Thoreau's writings edited by Henry Aiken Metcalf. Another version, with significant differences, can be found in Henry D. Thoreau: Early Essays and Miscellanies, edited by Joseph J. Moldenhauer and Edwin Moser, with Alexander C. Kern.

Metcalf writes in his introduction that he knew of three drafts of this essay, and he drew on all three of them to construct the version he prepared. He hinted that there may have been an additional fourth draft that had yet to surface.

The notes to the Moldenhauer, Moser & Kern version say that Metcalf "misread the holograph at several points, omitted occasional words and phrases, ignored some pencil cancellations, and amplified Thoreau's text with passages from the working manuscripts and from the Raleigh Works. None of these changes carry authority."

== Themes ==
The essay praises Sir Walter Raleigh as a flawed but heroic figure, who failed to use his heroic character to heroic ends. Thoreau concludes by begging America to produce such a hero:

We have considered a fair specimen of an Englishman in the sixteenth century; but it behooves us to be fairer specimens of American men in the nineteenth. The gods have given man no constant gift, but the power and liberty to act greatly. How many wait for health and warm weather to be heroic and noble! We are apt to think there is a kind of virtue which need not be heroic and brave – but in fact virtue is the deed of the bravest; and only the hardy souls venture upon it, for it deals in what we have no experience, and alone does the rude pioneer work of the world. In winter is its campaign, and it never goes into quarters. "Sit not down," said Sir Thomas Browne, "in the popular seats and common level of virtues, but endeavor to make them heroical. Offer not only peace-offerings, but holocausts, unto God".

Sixteen years later, in 1859, Thoreau delivered his lecture A Plea for Captain John Brown (published as an essay in 1860). The essayist's judgment of the character of John Brown resumed and expanded upon the themes launched here.

== Sources ==
- Sir Walter Raleigh (ISBN 978-1603550611)
- My Thoughts are Murder to the State by H.D. Thoreau (ISBN 978-1434804266)
- The Higher Law: Thoreau on Civil Disobedience and Reform (ISBN 978-0691118765)
- Collected Essays and Poems by Henry David Thoreau (ISBN 978-1-88301195-6)
