= The Maine Woods =

1864 book by Henry David Thoreau

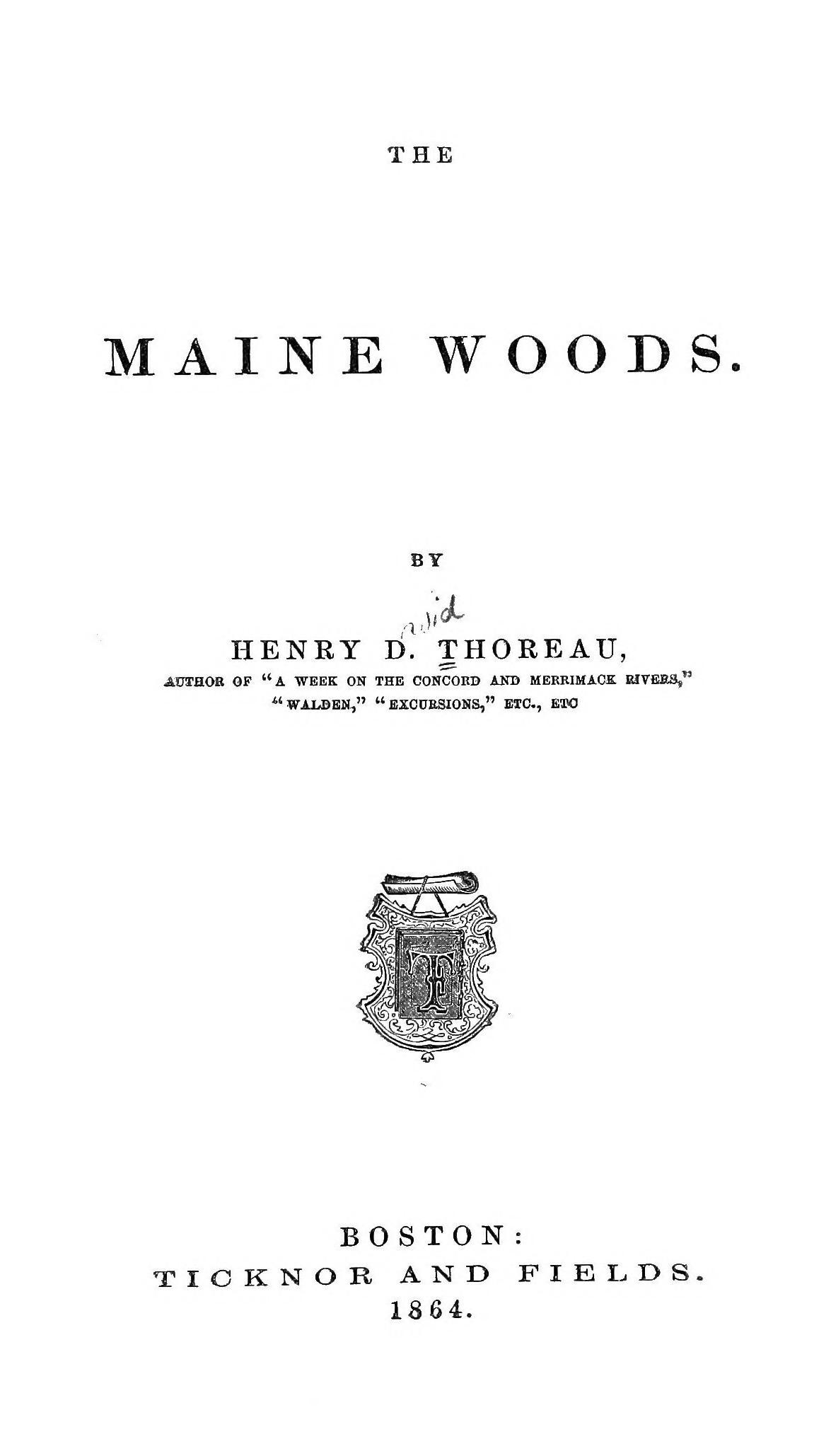
Title page of The Maine Woods, 1864

The Maine Woods is an 1864 book by American naturalist writer Henry David Thoreau. Published two years after the author's death, it is a collection of three writings recounting trips Thoreau made through the North Maine Woods.

== Writings ==
The Maine Woods was edited by William Ellery Channing and consists of three writings and an appendix. Of the three writings, Ktaadn and Chesuncook are revised versions of manuscripts previously published in magazines, while The Allegash and East Branch was only published in the book.

=== Ktaadn ===
In July 1846, Thoreau was jailed for one night for refusing to pay his taxes — an act he later described as civil disobedience in protest of the Mexican-American war. In a desire to experience "a primitive wood", Thoreau departed Concord for Bangor weeks later. First published in The Union Magazine of Literature and Art in 1848, Ktaadn describes Thoreau's journey to Mount Katahdin. Passing Indian Island on the way to Bangor, Thoreau described a juxtaposition of the bustling industry in the city and the conditions of the Native American community. After arriving in Bangor, Thoreau hired local guides—Penobscot Native Americans and local loggers—before departing towards Mount Katahdin.

=== Chesuncook ===
Originally published across three issues of The Atlantic in 1858, the essay describes a trip Thoreau took to Maine five years prior. Thoreau employs a Penobscot guide named Joe Aitteon to venture to Chesuncook Lake.

Thoreau originally submitted Chesuncook for publication in The Atlantic after being approached by its editor, James Russell Lowell. Prior to its serialized release in the magazine, Thoreau received an advanced copy for review. Noticing that a sentence had been crossed out — purportedly because Lowell felt it was too flowery — Thoreau sent the draft back to the publisher with a note indicating the struckthrough sentence should be retained.

It is the living spirit of the tree, not its spirit of turpentine, with which I sympathize, and which heals my cuts. ~~It is as immortal as I am, and perchance will go to as high a heaven, there to tower above me still.~~

— Excerpt of Chesuncook; the struck text was omitted by the editor

On June 22, 1858, an incensed Thoreau wrote to Lowell after discovering the sentence had been omitted from final publication:

The editor has, in this case, no more right to omit a sentiment than to insert one, or put words into my mouth [...] I could excuse a man who was afraid of an uplifted fist, but if one habitually manifests fear at the utterance of a sincere thought, I must think that his life is a kind of nightmare continued into broad daylight.

After this perceived slight, Thoreau would refuse to work with Lowell again. Three years after Thoreau's death, Lowell wrote an essay in North American Review attacking Thoreau's character and abilities as an author.

=== The Allegash and East Branch ===
Appearing in print for the first time in The Maine Woods, The Allegash and East Branch was one of the last pieces of writing Thoreau worked on before his death. The longest section of the book, it describes Thoreau's 1857 excursion in a more academic prose than the earlier texts.

== Reception ==
Contemporary reviews were mixed. Thomas Wentworth Higginson's 1864 review of The Maine Woods criticized Thoreau's affection of nature as a betrayal of civilization, writing that, "though he did not personally ignore one duty of domestic life, he yet held a system which would have excluded wife and child, house and property".

In a 1907 essay in The Atlantic, John Townsend Trowbridge compared Chesuncook to Lowell's Moosehead Journal, an earlier chronicle of Lowell's trip to Maine. While Trowbridge remarked that Moosehead had "astonished readers by its delightful humor and wit", Chesuncook was a "dryer, quainter, less exhuberant" text.

Theodore Roosevelt, while a student at Harvard University, was inspired to climb Mount Katahdin after encountering The Maine Woods.

Modern critiques discuss the book as a study of American civilization and frontier nativism. In his essay for The Concord Saunterer, John Kucich noted that while Ktaadn expounds the idea of American civilization as a measure of progress, "Chesuncook and The Allegash gradually undermine this narrative, at moments attacking the assumption that civilization represents progress at all".
