= John Adolphus Etzler =

German-American inventor (1791–1846)

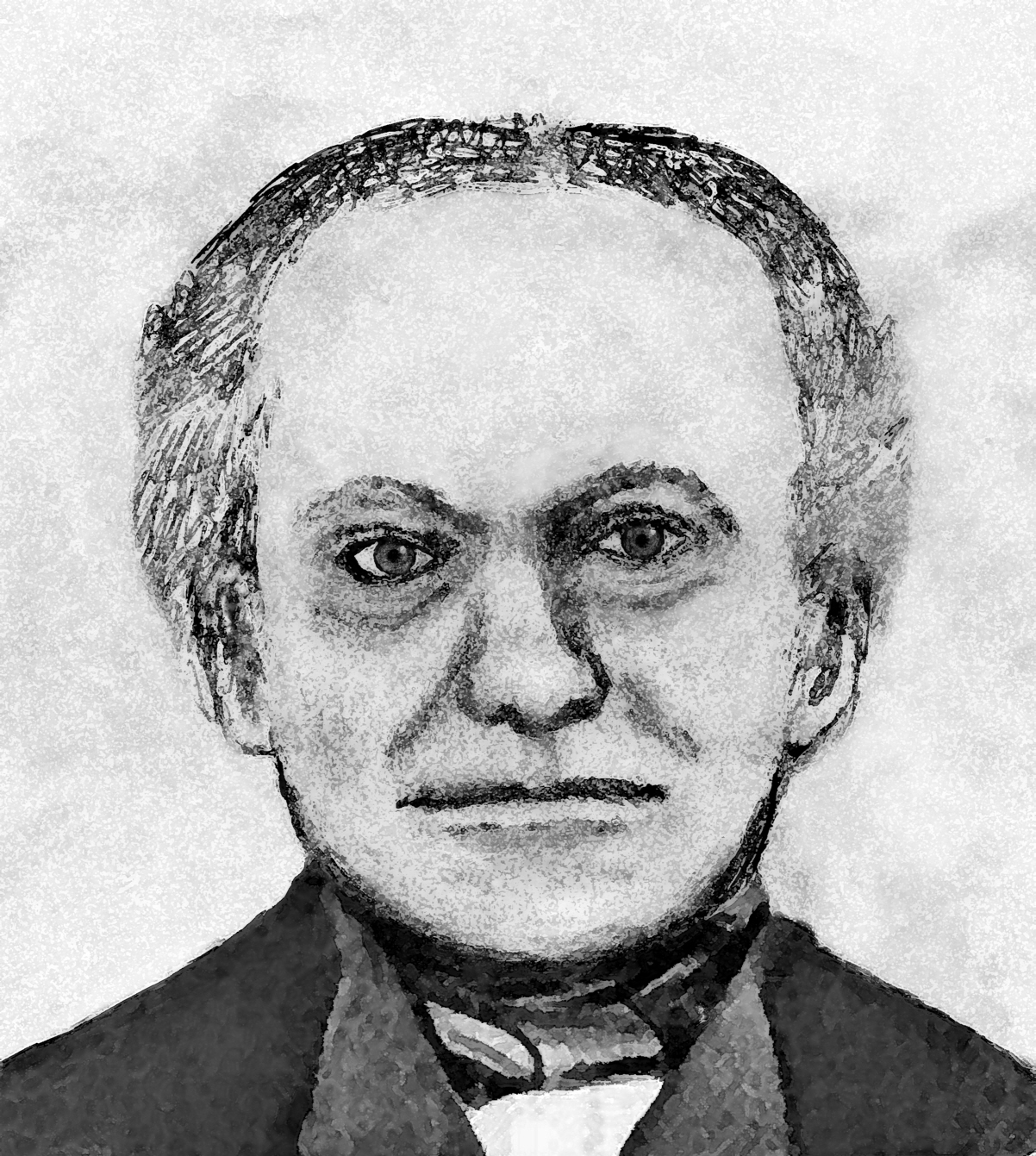
Contemporary portrait of Etzler

John Adolphus Etzler (1791–c. 1846) was a German engineer and inventor who immigrated to the United States in 1831 with a vision of creating a technological utopia. He was traveling with a group from Prussia, who included younger engineers John A. Roebling and his brother Carl.

Because of disagreements, the group broke up. Etzler and most of the group first settled near Pittsburgh, Pennsylvania. In the early 1840s Etzler and several dozen of his followers moved to the tropics, to set up utopian communities to use his inventions in Venezuela and Trinidad. He believed his inventions could work off natural forces and avoid human labor. Their efforts failed and many people died. Etzler survived but disappeared from the record.

== Time in the US ==
In 1833 in Pittsburgh, Etzler published his best-known work, a prospectus titled The Paradise within the Reach of all Men. It outlined detailed, visionary plans to harness the energy of wind, water and sun to benefit mankind. This followed the 1829 publication in France of Charles Fourier's Le Nouveau Monde, which had offered a vision of cooperative society. It inspired a number of communities.

Etzel believed that contemporary technology was sufficient, if only slightly developed and astutely applied, to bring about an earthly paradise of effortless plenty within a matter of a few years. He occasionally was able to gain sufficient financial backing and supporters to make a go at turning some of his inventions into reality. He developed blueprints for what he described as a Naval Automaton, to be powered by ocean waves. Another plan was to create a floating island to be powered by windmills after fertile soil had been built up.

Etzel hoped for a revolution in agriculture, to be based on his most ambitious work, known as the "Satellite". It was a general-purpose cultivation tool to be propelled using ropes that would transmit power from a stationary source powered by wind. Theoretically it could be applied to "plow, cut down trees, level a field, dig ditches and canals, and for many other uses." Designed as the size of a modern cargo container, the device proved impractical and could not be produced. (In the 21st century, standard intermodal containers are 8 ft (2.43m) wide, 8.5 ft (2.59m) high and come in two lengths; 20 ft (6.06m) and 40 ft (12.2m).)

== Move to the tropics ==
In the early 1840s, Etzler and several dozen of his more committed followers planned to move to South America. They intended to set up colonies in Venezuela and Trinidad that would be based on his labor-saving inventions. In 1845, over 250 people sailed to Venezuela; however the plans were insufficient and poorly implemented. Several European Americans died of tropical diseases and starvation. The colonies failed, and there were bitter recriminations. Etzler survived but his spirit was crushed, and he disappeared from the records.

== The Roeblings ==
The two Roebling brothers bought land further away and established Saxonburg, Pennsylvania, planning a Prussian colony. It did not succeed although they farmed for a time. Carl Roebling died in 1837. John Roebling returned to engineering and became known for inventing wire cable and a way to produce it, in addition to his designs for numerous suspension bridges. He designed three in Pittsburgh. His most famous work is the Brooklyn Bridge, which construction his son Washington Roebling and his wife Emily Warren Roebling supervised after the father's death in 1869.

== Works ==
- The Paradise within the Reach of all Men, without Labor, by Powers of Nature and Machinery: An Address to all intelligent men, in two parts (1833)
- Machinery (1833)
- The New World or Mechanical System (1841)
- Description of the Naval Automaton, Invented by J. A. Etzler (184?)
- Dialogue on Etzler's Paradise: Between Messrs. Clear, Flat, Dunce, and Grudge (1842)
- Emigration to the Tropical World, for the Melioration of All Classes of People of All Nations (1844)
- Two Visions of J. A. Etzler (1844)

=== Patents ===
- Mode of Propelling Locomotives by Stationary Power
- Navigating and Propelling Vessels by the Action of the Wind and Waves

== See also ==
- Paradise (to be) Regained - Henry David Thoreau’s critique of Etzler's techno-utopianism
