= Wheeler-Minot Farmhouse =

Historic house in Massachusetts, United States

- U.S. National Register of Historic Places
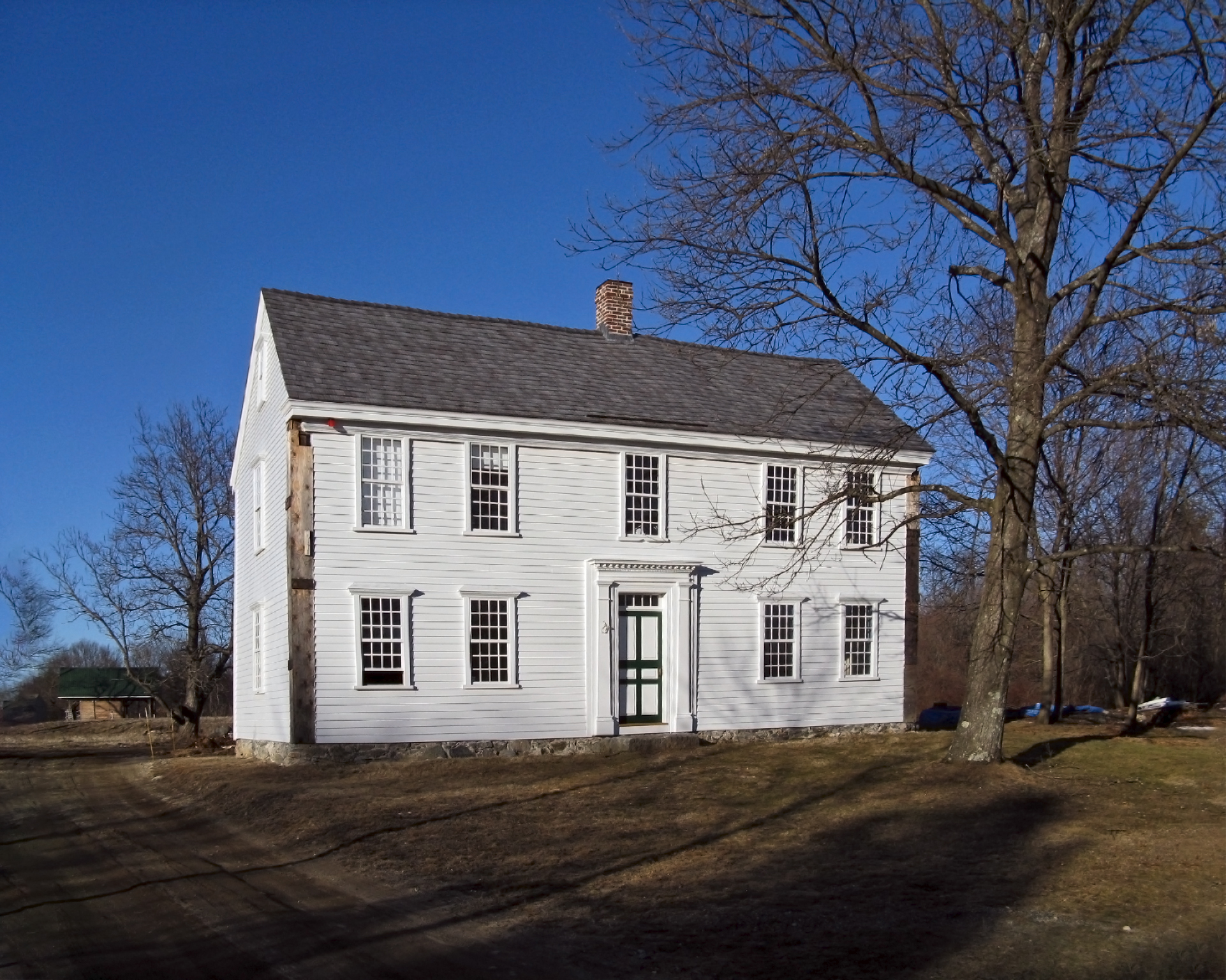
- Wheeler-Minot Farmhouse

- Location within Massachusetts Location within the United States
- Interactive map showing the location for Wheeler-Minot Farmhouse
- Location: Concord, Massachusetts
- Coordinates: 42°28′07.5″N 71°18′40″W
- Area: 20.3 acres (8.2 ha)
- Built: 1730
- Architectural style: Colonial, Georgian
- NRHP reference No.: 04000190
- Added to NRHP: March 19, 2004

The Wheeler-Minot Farmhouse, also known as the Thoreau Farm or the Henry David Thoreau Birthplace, is a historic house at 341 Virginia Road in Concord, Massachusetts, United States. It is significant as the birthplace of writer Henry David Thoreau. The house was listed on the National Register of Historic Places in 2004. It currently serves as a historic house museum and is open to the public.

== History ==
The Wheeler-Minot Farmhouse is set on a 20-acre (8.1 ha) property on the north side of Virginia Road in eastern Concord. The house is a 2 1/2-story wood-frame structure, five bays wide, with a side-gable roof, large central chimney, clapboard siding, and a fieldstone foundation. The center entrance is flanked by pilasters and topped by a dentillated cornice.

The farmhouse was originally built circa 1730 by John Wheeler. Later, the farm was purchased by Deacon Samuel Minot for his second son Jonas. Jonas Minot was the stepfather of Thoreau's mother, having become the second husband of his maternal grandmother.

Though the building has been extensively modified over the years, this house was the farmhouse of a prominent area farm for 200 years.

Unlike other writers and thinkers associated with Concord—including Ralph Waldo Emerson, Nathaniel Hawthorne, Amos Bronson Alcott, and Louisa May Alcott—Henry David Thoreau was the only one born in the town. He was born on the family farm on July 12, 1817. He lived in town for most of his life.

Shortly after Thoreau's death in 1862, scholars, disciples, and tourists began to seek out the author's birthplace.

== Restoration ==
The house was acquired in 1995 by the Thoreau Farm Trust, a non-profit organization. The site underwent an extensive restoration and is now a museum open to the public on weekends between May and October.

== See also ==
- National Register of Historic Places listings in Concord, Massachusetts
