= Life Without Principle =

1863 essay by Henry David Thoreau

"Life Without Principle" is an essay by Henry David Thoreau that offers his program for a righteous livelihood. It was published in 1863, a few months after his death.

== Overview ==
The essay provides an overview of Thoreau's philosophy of work and life.

It begins by challenging the notion that work is the most crucial aspect of an individual's life. He posits that work often clashes with poetry and living, and emphasizes the need for work to be fulfilling. He reflects on his guilt at watching his neighbor, who was working in the early morning hours, from the comfort of his own home. However, his opinion changes when he observes the result of the labor – a piece of meaningless yard art. Thoreau asserts that he requires no direction from the "police of meaningless labor" in determining how to spend his time.

"All great enterprises are self supporting. The poet, for instance, must sustain his body by his poetry, as the boiler in the wood-cutting mill is fed with the shavings it creates. You must get your living by loving."

The essay was written during the time of the California Gold Rush and he wrote that "a grain of gold will gild a great surface, but not so much as a grain of wisdom."

In his own occasional work as a surveyor, he observed that, when presenting different methods of surveying a piece of land, the owner would ask which method would give the owner the most land, rather than which was the most accurate way to do it. He went on to write on the constant motion of work and business and on how people value making money above all else.

== Composition and publication history ==
On October 18, 1855, Thoreau was invited to participate in a series of lectures on reform at the Railroad Hall in Providence, Rhode Island. With little time to prepare, he searched his journals for inspiration. He found a passage he had written on September 7, 1851: "I do not so much wish to know how to economize time as how to spend it, by what means to grow rich, that the day may not have been in vain." After some re-working, the end result was a lecture delivered on December 6, 1855, which he titled "What Shall It Profit?". The title, before it was altered to "Life Without Principle", referenced a verse in the Gospel of Mark, 8:36. Thoreau later revised his notes and delivered the lecture under the title "Life Misspent".

Thoreau prepared "Life Without Principle" for publication during the final months of his life based on his journal notes between 1851 and 1855 that originally inspired his lecture. It was published posthumously in 1863. In addition to "Life Without Principle", Thoreau was writing and re-working several other lectures and essays for publication in the final months of his life, including "Walking", "Wild Apples", and "Autumnal Tints".

== Analysis ==
Thoreau intended the original title, "What Shall It Profit?", as a Biblical reference (Mark 8:36, "For what shall it profit a man, if he shall gain the whole world, and lose his own soul?").

A few lines earlier, Mark 8:33, Jesus turns to Peter and says, "Get thee behind me, Satan; for thou savorest not the things that be of God, but the things that be of man." Thoreau originally alluded to this line as well in the earlier version of his lecture, referencing the Gold Rush: "Satan, from one of his elevations, showed mankind the kingdom of California, and instead of the cry 'Get thee behind me, Satan,' they shouted, 'Go ahead!' and he had to exert himself to get there first".

Scholar Barbara Packer contends that Thoreau's shifting titles show his shifting pity and contempt for his contemporaries who he felt were employed in ways that degraded life or the country.
