= Thomas Carlyle and His Works =

1847 essay by Henry David Thoreau

"Thomas Carlyle and His Works" is an essay written by Henry David Thoreau that praises the writings of Thomas Carlyle.

The essay demonstrates a few themes that show up elsewhere in Thoreau's writings. First of these is Thoreau's eagerness to find a hero. Carlyle wrote On Heroes, Hero-Worship, & the Heroic in History, which Thoreau considered his crowning achievement.

While Thoreau as a young man was still looking for a hero to model himself after, he knew that ultimately he would have to cast models aside. He felt that the problem with religion was that when a Christ or a Buddha discovered something magnificent and important, people then spent their lives celebrating (or arguing about) the discovery but never bothering to try to discover it themselves. Thoreau appreciated the attitude of those who would not settle to think pre-conceived thoughts, but who instead wished to break out of the box of religious tradition and think independently for oneself. In Carlyle's case, Thoreau used this same appreciation to praise the "Carlylisms" that others found to be ostentatious: "He does not go to the dictionary, the word-book, but to the word-manufactory itself, and has made endless work for the lexicographers." Thoreau thought Carlyle to be of the "Reformer class" and that he had greatly contributed to humanity through his writings.

"The end of man is an action and not a thought, though it be the noblest," Carlyle wrote, and Thoreau sums up Carlyle's philosophy in this way:

One thing is certain – that we had best be doing something in good earnest henceforth forever; that's an indispensable philosophy.

== Reception ==
Carlyle reported to Emerson that it was "carefully read, as beseemed, with due entertainment and recognition." He went on:

A vigorous Mr Thoreau, . . . recognises us, and various other things, in a most admiring greathearted manner; for which, as for part of the confused voice from the jury-box (not yet summed into a verdict, nor likely to be summed till Doomsday, nor needful to sum), the poor prisoner at the bar may justly express himself thankful!
