= Herald of Freedom (essay) =

1844 essay by Henry David Thoreau

"Herald of Freedom" was an essay by Henry David Thoreau, published in The Dial in 1844, that praised Herald of Freedom, the journal of the New Hampshire Anti-Slavery Society, and its editor, Nathaniel P. Rogers. After Rogers died, Thoreau revised the essay and republished it.

== Sources ==
- My Thoughts Are Murder to the State by Henry David Thoreau (ISBN 978-1434804266)
- The Higher Law: Thoreau on Civil Disobedience and Reform (ISBN 978-0691118765)
- Collected Essays and Poems by Henry David Thoreau (ISBN 978-1-88301195-6)
