= Wendell Phillips Before the Concord Lyceum =

1845 essay by Henry David Thoreau

"Wendell Phillips Before the Concord Lyceum" is an essay style letter-to-the-editor written by Henry David Thoreau and published in The Liberator in 1845 that praised the abolitionist lecturer Wendell Phillips.

== Sources ==
- My Thoughts are Murder to the State by Henry David Thoreau (ISBN 978-1434804266)
- The Higher Law: Thoreau on Civil Disobedience and Reform (ISBN 978-0691118765)
- Collected Essays and Poems by Henry David Thoreau (ISBN 978-1-88301195-6)
