= Paradise (to be) Regained =

1843 essay by Henry David Thoreau

"Paradise (to be) Regained" is an essay written by Henry David Thoreau and published in 1843 in the United States Magazine and Democratic Review. It takes the form of a review of John Adolphus Etzler's book The Paradise within the Reach of all Men, without Labor, by Powers of Nature and Machinery: An Address to all intelligent men, in two parts, which had come out in a new edition the previous year. The essay amplifies such Thoreauvian themes as imploring people to self-betterment and a distrust of humanity's attempts to improve upon nature.

== Summary ==
Etzler's book is technological utopianism taken to amazing extremes. Etzler believed that the technology of his time was adequate, if astutely applied, to usher in a paradise on earth in which nobody would need to toil, all needs would be provided, and the earth would be transformed into palaces and gardens. He just needed about ten years and some start-up financing; the blueprints were already written up.

Thoreau's review includes several lengthy excerpts from Etzler's book that give a good feel for its contents and its bombast. To a large extent, Thoreau lets the book review itself through these demonstrative excerpts, only occasionally stopping to advance a minor technical quibble against a grandiose technological extrapolation or to experiment with going even further out on Etzler's limb.

Thoreau sees Etzler's mad utopian dreams as being something like the unstated and unconscious wishes of the more moderate and practical technological utopians of his time – the trajectory wished for (but never out loud) by the Industrial Revolutionaries and scientists and reformers: "Let us not succumb to nature. We will marshal the clouds and restrain tempests; we will bottle up pestilent exhalations; we will probe for earthquakes, grub them up, and give vent to the dangerous gas; we will disembowel the volcano, and extract its poison, take its seed out." And why stop there?

We will wash water, and warm fire, and cool ice, and underprop the earth. We will teach birds to fly, and fishes to swim, and ruminants to chew the cud. It is time we had looked into these things.

Ralph Waldo Emerson had recommended Etzler's book to Thoreau and suggested that he write the review. Emerson himself had been impressed enough by Etzler's technological prescience to worry about whether the vast energy and machinery of the future would make the working class obsolete and endangered.

As Thoreau sees it (once he gets the review behind him and starts letting his own philosophy take center stage) the problem is not that we have not applied sufficient energy and technology to put our great schemes into action, but that we have not energetically applied ourselves to improve our schemes. Etzler would have a person harness the wind, waves, sun, and moon who hasn't even developed self-control.

Thus is Paradise to be Regained, and that old and stern decree at length reversed. Man shall no more earn his living by the sweat of his brow. All labor shall be reduced to "a short turn of some crank," and "taking the finished article away." But there is a crank, – oh, how hard to be turned! Could there not be a crank upon a crank, – an infinitely small crank? – we would fain inquire. No, – alas! not. But there is a certain divine energy in every man, but sparingly employed as yet, which may be called the crank within, – the crank after all, – the prime mover in all machinery, – quite indispensable to all work. Would that we might get our hands on its handle!

== Sources ==
- My Thoughts are Murder to the State by H.D. Thoreau (ISBN 978-1434804266)
- The Higher Law: Thoreau on Civil Disobedience and Reform (ISBN 978-0691118765)
- Collected Essays and Poems by Henry David Thoreau (ISBN 978-1-88301195-6)
