= Slavery in Massachusetts =

1854 essay by Henry David Thoreau

"Slavery in Massachusetts" is an 1854 essay by Henry David Thoreau based on a speech he gave at an anti-slavery rally at Framingham, Massachusetts, on July 4, 1854, after the re-enslavement in Boston, Massachusetts of fugitive slave Anthony Burns.

== Sources ==
- My Thoughts are Murder to the State by Henry David Thoreau (ISBN 978-1434804266)
- The Higher Law: Thoreau on Civil Disobedience and Reform (ISBN 978-0691118765)
- Collected Essays and Poems by Henry David Thoreau (ISBN 978-1-88301195-6)
