= Walking (essay) =

Literary work by Henry David Thoreau

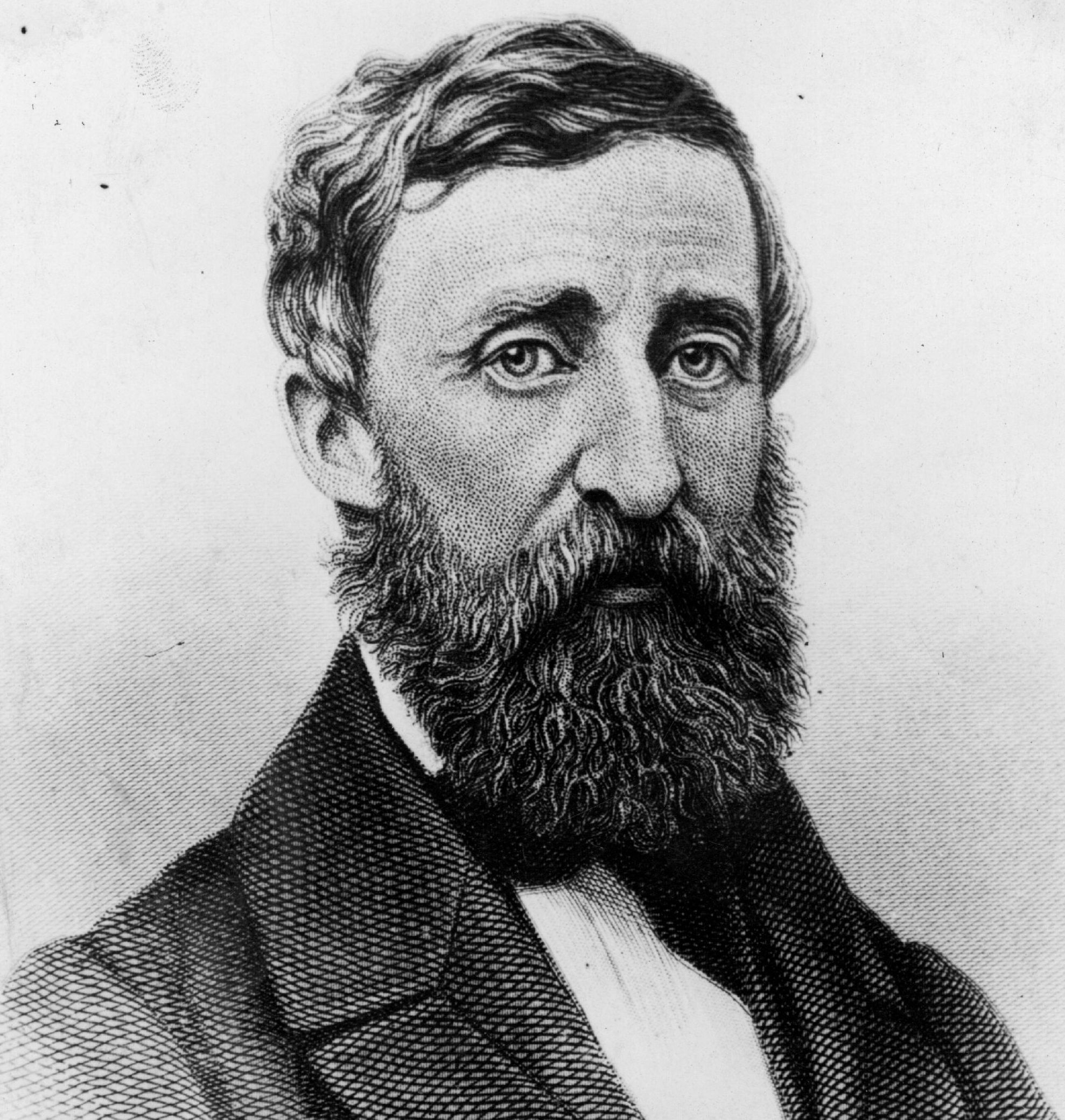
Henry David Thoreau

"Walking" is a lecture by Henry David Thoreau first delivered at the Concord Lyceum on April 23, 1851. It was written between 1851 and 1860, but parts were extracted from his earlier journals. Thoreau read the piece a total of ten times, more than any other of his lectures. "Walking" was first published as an essay in the Atlantic Monthly after his death in 1862.

== Themes ==
Walking is a work of sustained philosophical reflection by Henry David Thoreau that focuses on the themes of introspection, wilderness, and civilization, and exploration. First published in 1862 after Thoreau's death, Walking was originally given as a lecture to the Concord Lyceum in 1851. Thoreau heavily incorporated previous journal entries from as far back as 1837 to develop many of the central ideas in Walking. Of all his presentations, this one was the most frequently delivered by Thoreau. In Walking, the act of strolling becomes a way to explore the interplay between self-discovery, the natural world, and social existence, all woven into a cohesive life of philosophy.

Self-Reflection

- Self-reflection as a key theme in Walking
- Learning through experience rather than observation
- Movement through nature as a path to self-awareness

Self-reflection plays an important role in Walking, though Thoreau makes it clear that it goes hand in hand with learning from the world around the individual. Thoreau does not try to find knowledge of self through only thinking about his surroundings or socializing with people but experiencing life. He recounts times when he sauntered around to escape society so that he can reflect on his life through these experiences he has when out in nature. In Walking, this is shown through his emphasis on movement through natural landscapes as a way of clearing the mind from social pressures and becoming more aware of both the external and internal thought.This connects to scholarly interpretations that emphasize experience as central to knowledge. When talking about how he sees society, Thoreau does not see one as more important than the other but seeing them as counterparts. This idea is also supported by scholarship emphasizing the role of lived experience in Thoreau's philosophy.This idea is mirrored in the text, where Thoreau’s walks become a way of interpreting the world, enabling introspection through both doing and pondering.

Wildness and Society

- Contrast between natural life and structured society
- Wildness as truth, vitality, and authenticity
- Connection to Emerson's philosophy

Related to his focus on mindfulness, is Thoreau's contemplation of the wild versus society. During the entirety of the essay, he makes parallels between society and the life force of the wild. He argues that society is constricting and artificial while what grows and exists in the wild is natural. He redefines “wildness” throughout the essay to mean not just the plants and animals found in nature but life itself. The phrase "In Wildness is the preservation of the World" expresses his belief that wildness represents true creation, vitality, and honesty. This idea can also be tied to Ralph Waldo Emerson's Nature (essay) but what makes Walden different is Thoreau's focus on actually experiencing these ideas. Although Emerson speaks of nature as a form of spiritual understanding, Thoreau argues that we can only come to that understanding through direct experience. Through Walking, individuals are able to become part of the natural world.

Critique of Society

- Society as restrictive and artificial
- Daily routines limiting freedom
- Walking as resistance

In regards to this, society can easily become the cage that imprisons us from nature's liveliness. Thoreau spoke against our daily lives filled with routines, responsibilities, and material worries. He felt that society inhibited us from truly knowing because it creates restrictions on where we can go, how we act, and what we value. When wandering through the woods, we leave our structured societal lives behind and return to a carefree way of existence. Walking was Thoreau's rebellion against the norms of society. Venturing off into the wild allows one to step outside society and their rules. Towns are created and organized by society. Fields are manipulated by people to grow specific crops. Everywhere we go, humans try to put some sort of order to the world. The path into the wild is unknown and while walking on it, regular labels do not apply. Walking gives us the ability to feel and think outside of society's labels.

Exploration

- Walking as philosophical and physical exploration
- Value of being lost and uncertain
- Discovery through movement

Another key aspect, deeply intertwined with transcendentalism, is the idea of exploration. Exploration builds upon the idea of movement, curiosity, wondering, and discovery. Thoreau makes the argument that walking is always an exploration. The walker explores the earth under their feet while also continually exploring their understanding of the world and previously held concepts. For Thoreau, he feels as if individuals must be willing to get lost. The individual must be willing to forget where they are going and let go of their current understanding. How are you able to explore when you are lost? It's interesting to think about what it means to be lost. people are conditioned to understand "lost" as a negative. However, Thoreau suggests that when individuals are lost, they are experiencing wonder and uncertainty about what will happen next and how they will proceed. To lose one's sense of direction becomes an important concept in itself. To lose oneself is to break out of habitual patterns of thought and behavior.

Interconnectedness

- Human connection to nature
- Walking as participation in natural rhythms
- Reduction of ego through experience

Implicit in this focus on exploration is also a sense of interconnectedness between walkers and the natural world around them. This connection comes because walking allows the body to exist within the rhythms and flow of nature. As Thoreau puts it, walking came before clock-time and socially constructed order. The more that individuals wander, the less that things are translated through personal ego or bias. Individuals exist within the cycles of the world around them. Through exploration, Individuals find their place in the world as something larger than themselves.

Conclusion

- Integration of major themes
- Walking as philosophy in action
- Lasting importance in transcendentalist thought

The overlap between all three motifs discussed above—the theme of self-reliance, of the Wild versus society, and of exploration—discloses Walking as a transcendental meditation on humanity itself. Walking seeks to redefine humanity's relationship with nature as well as societally imposed structures by slowing down and taking in one's surroundings on foot. By defining walking as a cognitive process that requires both action and thought, Thoreau seeks to convey his ideal way of living in the world. One that is grounded in the reality of the earth, but still allows room to grow and think transcendentally. For these reasons and more, Walking remains a hallmark piece of transcendentalist literature as well as environmental philosophy.

== Writing style ==
"Walking" has an autobiographical side and reflects the author’s personal experiences. As Rebecca Solnit has stated in Wanderlust: A History of Walking, the rhythm of walking could be the sources of music, conversation, thoughts, and literature. In over ten years of walking, Thoreau kept observing nature, organizing his thought, and considering the best way to express his lecture; his diary shows what elements in his daily life influenced his environmental view and motivated him to write it. Above all, the author’s correspondence with friends provides not only his lecture career but also his works and his writing process. As a result, his essay is told by the voice of the confident narrator, given some authority. Moreover, using allusion, he succeeded in not only understanding the essay broadly but also obtaining a form of poetry, and with his lecture and the new writing style, "Walking" became a new critique of the existing society.

== See also ==
- Walden
- "The Old Marlborough Road", a poem within "Walking"

== Sources ==
- Bodily, Christopher. "Henry David Thoreau: The Instrumental Transcendentalist?" Journal of Economic Issues, vol. 21. no.1, 1987, pp. 203-18. JSTOR,http://www.jstor.org/stable/
- Curtis, Kent. "The Virtue of Thoreau: Biography, Geography, and History in Walden Woods." Environmental History, vol. 15, no.1, 2010, pp.31-35. JSTOR,http://www.jstor.org/stable/20749642.
- Thoreau, Henry (2000). Atkinson, Brooks (ed.). Walden and Other Writings. New York: Random House, Inc. ISBN 9780679783343.
- "Walking". Project Gutenberg.
