= Henry David Thoreau =

American philosopher (1817–1862)

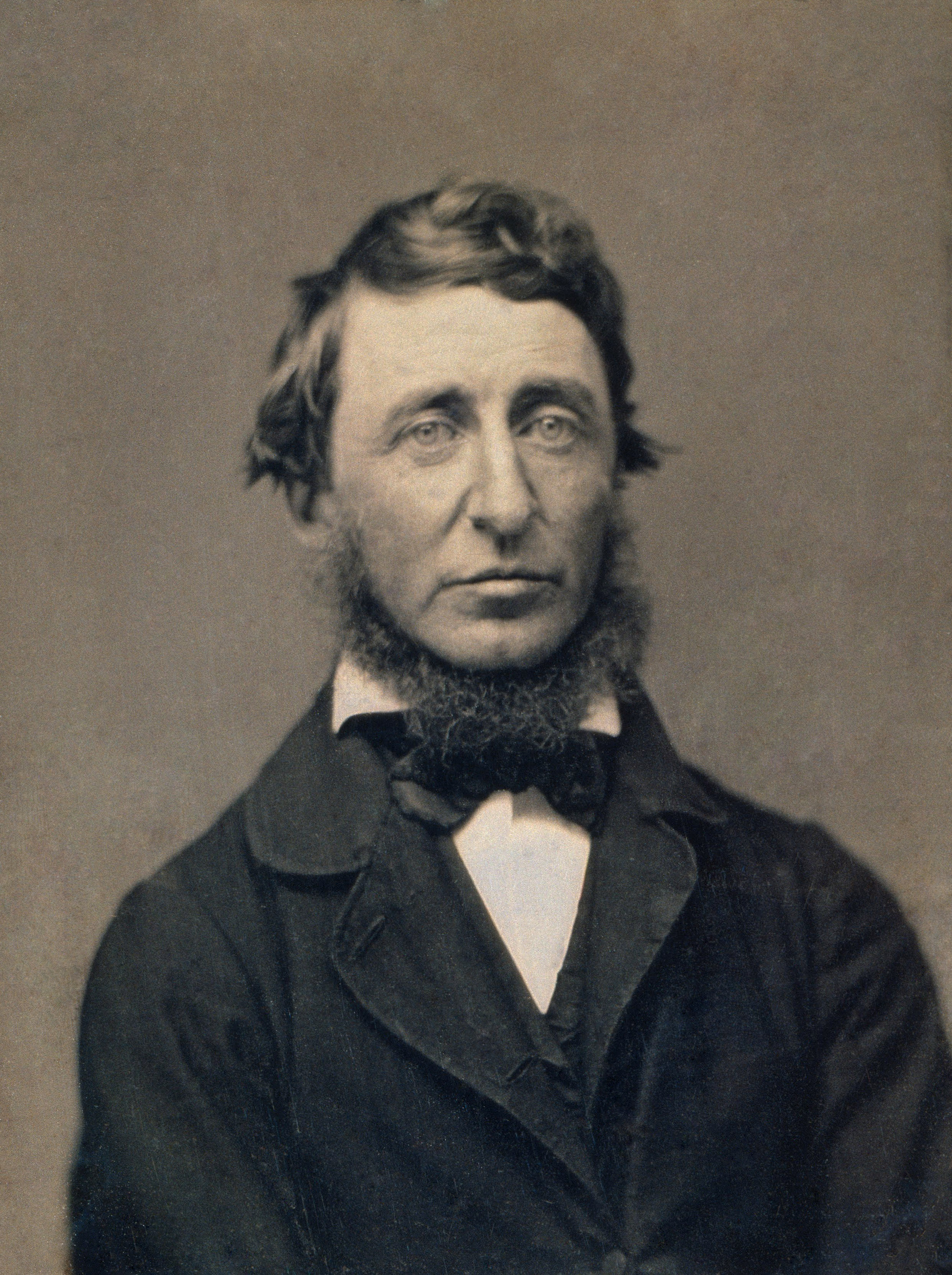
- Thoreau in 1856
- Born: David Henry Thoreau; July 12, 1817; Concord, Massachusetts, U.S.
- Died: May 6, 1862 (aged 44); Concord, Massachusetts, U.S.

Education
- Education: Harvard College

Philosophical work
- Era: 19th-century philosophy
- Region: Western philosophy
- School: Transcendentalism
- Main interests: Ethics; poetry; religion; politics; biology; philosophy; history
- Notable ideas: Abolitionism; tax resistance; development criticism; civil disobedience; conscientious objection; direct action; environmentalism; simple living; Economic materialism; Welfarism; Media consumption; Humanism; Empirical Naturalism

Henry David Thoreau (born David Henry Thoreau; July 12, 1817 – May 6, 1862) was an American naturalist essayist, poet, and philosopher. A leading transcendentalist, he is best known for his book Walden, a reflection upon simple living in natural surroundings, and his essay "Civil Disobedience" (originally published as "Resistance to Civil Government"), an argument in favor of citizen disobedience against an unjust state.

Thoreau's books, journals, and poetry amount to more than 20 volumes. Among his lasting contributions are his writings on natural history and philosophy, in which he anticipated the methods and findings of ecology and environmental history, two sources of modern-day environmentalism. His literary style interweaves close observation of nature, personal experience, pointed rhetoric, symbolic meanings, and historical lore, while displaying a poetic sensibility, philosophical austerity, and attention to practical detail. He was also deeply interested in the idea of survival in the face of hostile elements, historical change, and natural decay; at the same time he advocated abandoning waste and illusion to discover life's true essential needs.

Thoreau was a lifelong abolitionist, delivering lectures that attacked the fugitive slave law while praising the writings of Wendell Phillips and defending the abolitionist John Brown. Thoreau's philosophy of civil disobedience later influenced the political thoughts and actions of notable figures such as Leo Tolstoy, Mahatma Gandhi, and Martin Luther King Jr.

== Pronunciation of his name ==
Amos Bronson Alcott (who wrote in 1860 that "He is rightly named Thorough") and Thoreau's aunt each wrote that "Thoreau" is pronounced like the word thorough, pronounced as /ˈθʌroʊ/ THURR-oh in General American, but more precisely as /ˈθɔːroʊ/ THAWR-oh in 19th century New England.

In 1918, Edward Waldo Emerson wrote: "We always called my friend Thórow, the h sounded, and accent on the first syllable."

In the early 20th century, a resurgence in foreign interest in Thoreau's work caused people to assume that the name was of foreign origin, leading modern-day American English speakers to commonly (mis)pronounce the name /θəˈroʊ/ thə-ROH, with the stress on the second syllable.

== Physical appearance ==
Thoreau had a distinctive appearance, with a nose that he called his "most prominent feature". Of his appearance and disposition, Ellery Channing wrote:

His face, once seen, could not be forgotten. The features were quite marked: the nose aquiline or very Roman, like one of the portraits of Caesar (more like a beak, as was said); large overhanging brows above the deepest set blue eyes that could be seen, in certain lights, and in others gray,—eyes expressive of all shades of feeling, but never weak or near-sighted; the forehead not unusually broad or high, full of concentrated energy and purpose; the mouth with prominent lips, pursed up with meaning and thought when silent, and giving out when open with the most varied and unusual instructive sayings.

== Life ==
=== Early life and education, 1817–1837 ===
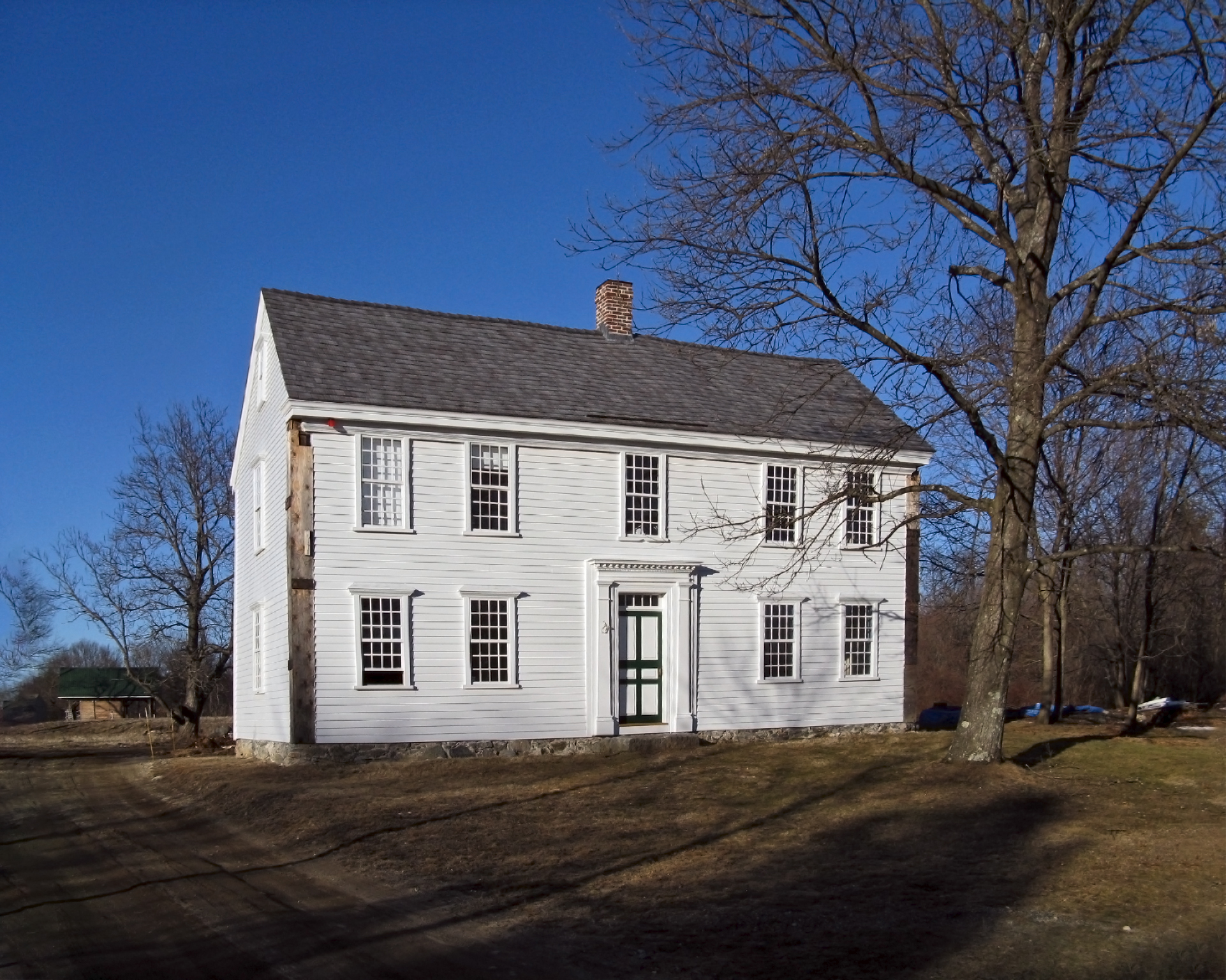
Thoreau's birthplace, the Wheeler-Minot Farmhouse in Concord, Massachusetts

Henry David Thoreau was born David Henry Thoreau in Concord, Massachusetts, into the "modest New England family" of John Thoreau, a pencil maker, and Cynthia Dunbar. His father was of French Protestant descent. His paternal grandfather had been born on the UK crown dependency island of Jersey. His maternal Scottish-American grandfather, Asa Dunbar, led Harvard's 1766 student "Butter rebellion", the first recorded student protest in the American colonies. David Henry was named after his recently deceased paternal uncle, David Thoreau. He began to call himself Henry David after he finished college; he never petitioned to make a legal name change.

He had two older siblings, Helen and John Jr., and a younger sister, Sophia Thoreau. None of the children married. Helen (1812–1849) died at age 37, from tuberculosis. John Jr. (1814–1842) died at age 27, of tetanus after cutting himself while shaving. Henry David (1817–1862) died at age 44, of tuberculosis. Sophia (1819–1876) survived him by 14 years, dying at age 56, of tuberculosis.

He studied at Harvard College between 1833 and 1837. He lived in Hollis Hall and took courses in rhetoric, classics, philosophy, mathematics, and science. He was a member of the Institute of 1770 (now the Hasty Pudding Club). According to legend, Thoreau refused to pay the five-dollar fee (approximately equivalent to $161 in 2025) for a Harvard master's diploma, which he described thus: Harvard College offered it to graduates "who proved their physical worth by being alive three years after graduating, and their saving, earning, or inheriting quality or condition by having Five Dollars to give the college". He commented, "Let every sheep keep its own skin", a reference to the tradition of using sheepskin vellum for diplomas.

Thoreau's birthplace still exists on Virginia Road in Concord. The house has been restored by the Thoreau Farm Trust, a nonprofit organization, and is now open to the public.

=== Return to Concord, 1837–1844 ===
The traditional professions open to college graduates—law, the church, business, medicine—did not interest Thoreau, so in 1835 he took a leave of absence from Harvard, during which he taught at a school in Canton, Massachusetts, living for two years at an earlier version of today's Colonial Inn in Concord. His grandfather owned the earliest of the three buildings that were later combined. After he graduated in 1837, Thoreau joined the faculty of the Concord public school, but he resigned after a few weeks rather than administer corporal punishment. He and his brother John then opened the Concord Academy, a grammar school in Concord, in 1838. They introduced several progressive concepts, including nature walks and visits to local shops and businesses. The school closed when John became fatally ill from tetanus in 1842 after cutting himself while shaving. He died in Henry's arms.

Upon graduation Thoreau returned home to Concord, where he met Ralph Waldo Emerson through a mutual friend. Emerson, who was 14 years his senior, took a paternal and at times patron-like interest in Thoreau, advising the young man and introducing him to a circle of local writers and thinkers, including Ellery Channing, Margaret Fuller, Bronson Alcott, and Nathaniel Hawthorne and his son Julian Hawthorne, who was a boy at the time.

Emerson urged Thoreau to contribute essays and poems to a quarterly periodical, The Dial, and lobbied the editor, Margaret Fuller, to publish those writings. Thoreau's first essay published in The Dial was "Aulus Persius Flaccus", an essay on the Roman poet and satirist, in July 1840. It consisted of revised passages from his journal, which he had begun keeping at Emerson's suggestion. The first journal entry, on October 22, 1837, reads, "'What are you doing now?' he asked. 'Do you keep a journal?' So I make my first entry to-day."

Thoreau was a philosopher of nature and its relation to the human condition. In his early years he followed transcendentalism, a loose and eclectic idealist philosophy advocated by Emerson, Fuller, and Alcott. They held that an ideal spiritual state transcends, or goes beyond, the physical and empirical, and that one achieves that insight via personal intuition rather than religious doctrine. In their view, Nature is the outward sign of inward spirit, expressing the "radical correspondence of visible things and human thoughts", as Emerson wrote in Nature (1836).

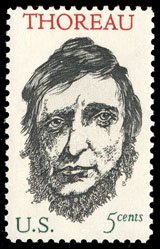
1967 U.S. postage stamp honoring Thoreau, designed by Leonard Baskin

On April 18, 1841, Thoreau moved in with the Emersons. There, from 1841 to 1844, he served as the children's tutor; he was also an editorial assistant, repairman and gardener. For a few months in 1843, he moved to the home of William Emerson on Staten Island, and tutored the family's sons while seeking contacts among literary men and journalists in the city who might help publish his writings, including his future literary representative Horace Greeley.

Thoreau returned to Concord and worked in his family's pencil factory, which he would continue to do alongside his writing and other work for most of his adult life. He resurrected the process of making good pencils with inferior graphite by using clay as a binder. The process of mixing graphite and clay, known as the Conté process, had been first patented by Nicolas-Jacques Conté in 1795. Thoreau made profitable use of a graphite source found in New Hampshire that had been purchased in 1821 by his uncle, Charles Dunbar. The company's other source of graphite had been Tantiusques, a mine operated by Native Americans in Sturbridge, Massachusetts. Later, Thoreau converted the pencil factory to produce plumbago, a name for graphite at the time, which was used in the electrotyping process.

Once back in Concord, Thoreau went through a restless period. In April 1844 he and his friend Edward Hoar accidentally set a fire that consumed 300 acres (120 hectares) of Walden Woods.

=== "Civil Disobedience" and the Walden years, 1845–1850 ===
Thoreau sites at Walden Pond

I went to the woods because I wished to live deliberately, to front only the essential facts of life, and see if I could not learn what it had to teach, and not, when I came to die, discover that I had not lived. I did not wish to live what was not life, living is so dear; nor did I wish to practice resignation, unless it was quite necessary. I wanted to live deep and suck out all the marrow of life, to live so sturdily and Spartan-like as to put to rout all that was not life, to cut a broad swath and shave close, to drive life into a corner, and reduce it to its lowest terms, and, if it proved to be mean, why then to get the whole and genuine meanness of it, and publish its meanness to the world; or if it were sublime, to know it by experience, and be able to give a true account of it in my next excursion.

— Henry David Thoreau, "Where I Lived, and What I Lived For", in Walden

Thoreau felt a need to concentrate and work more on his writing. In 1845, Ellery Channing told Thoreau, "Go out upon that, build yourself a hut, & there begin the grand process of devouring yourself alive. I see no other alternative, no other hope for you." Thus, on July 4, 1845, Thoreau embarked on a two-year experiment in simple living, moving to a small house he had built on land owned by Emerson in a second growth forest around the shores of Walden Pond, having had a request to build a hut on Flints Pond, near that of his friend Charles Stearns Wheeler, denied by the landowners due to the Fairhaven Bay incident. The house was in "a pretty pasture and woodlot" of 14 acres (5.7 hectares) that Emerson had bought, 1 1/2 miles (2.5 kilometers) from his family home. Whilst there, he wrote his only extended piece of literary criticism, "Thomas Carlyle and His Works".

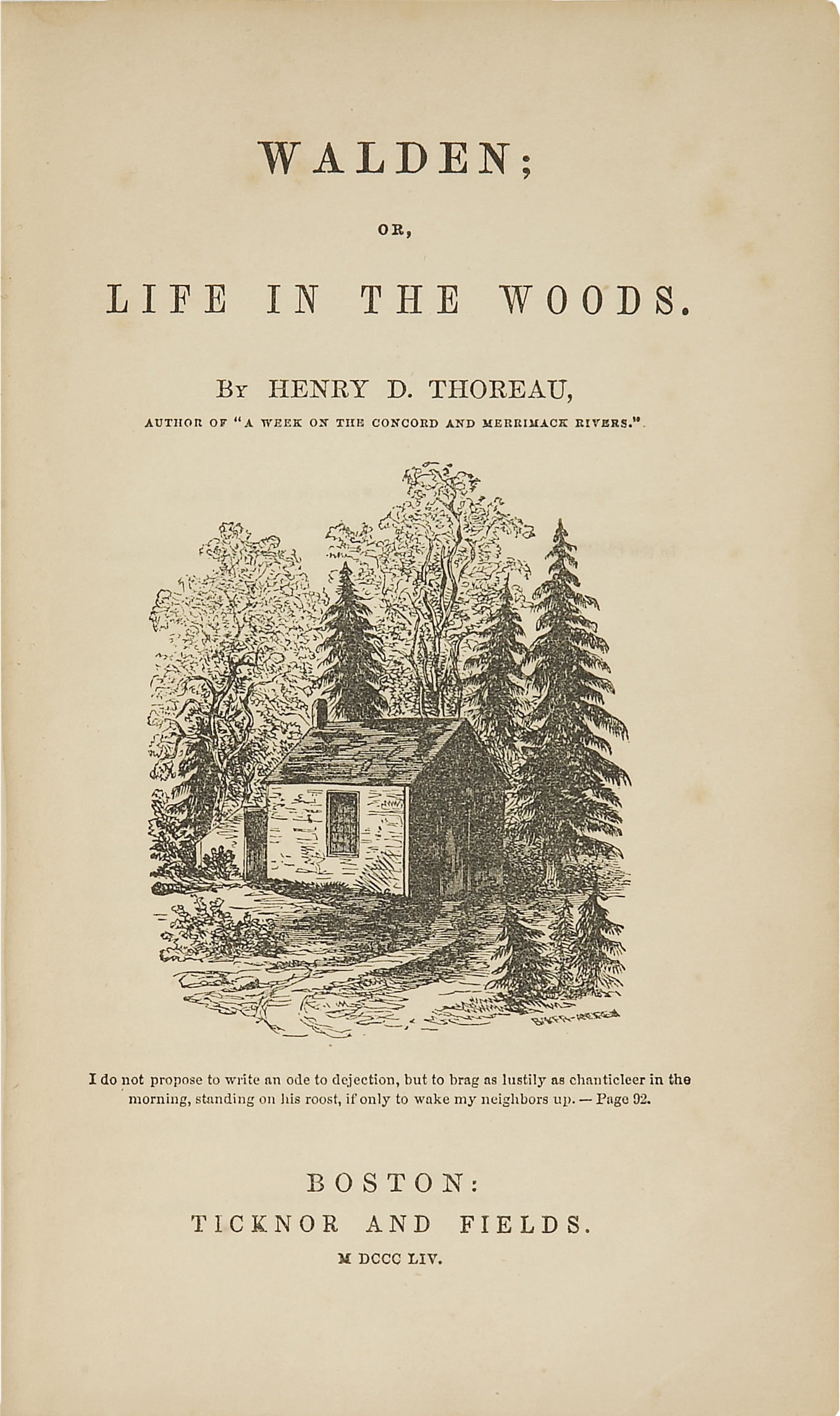
Original title page of Walden, with an illustration from a drawing by Thoreau's sister Sophia

On July 24 or July 25, 1846, Thoreau ran into the local tax collector, Sam Staples, who asked him to pay six years of delinquent poll taxes. Thoreau refused because of his opposition to the Mexican–American War and slavery, and he spent a night in jail because of this refusal. The next day Thoreau was freed when someone, likely to have been his aunt, paid the tax, against his wishes. The experience had a strong effect on Thoreau. In January and February 1848, he delivered lectures on "The Rights and Duties of the Individual in relation to Government", explaining his tax resistance at the Concord Lyceum. Bronson Alcott attended the lecture, writing in his journal on January 26:

Heard Thoreau's lecture before the Lyceum on the relation of the individual to the State—an admirable statement of the rights of the individual to self-government, and an attentive audience. His allusions to the Mexican War, to Mr. Hoar's expulsion from Carolina, his own imprisonment in Concord Jail for refusal to pay his tax, Mr. Hoar's payment of mine when taken to prison for a similar refusal, were all pertinent, well considered, and reasoned. I took great pleasure in this deed of Thoreau's.

— Bronson Alcott, Journals

Thoreau revised the lecture into an essay titled "Resistance to Civil Government", commonly known as "Civil Disobedience". It was published by Elizabeth Peabody in the Aesthetic Papers in May 1849. Thoreau had taken up a version of the principle enunciated by Percy Shelley in his political poem "The Mask of Anarchy" (1819), which begins with powerful images of the unjust forms of authority of his time and then imagines the stirrings of a radically new form of social action.

At Walden Pond, Thoreau completed a first draft of A Week on the Concord and Merrimack Rivers, an elegy to his brother John, describing their trip to the White Mountains in 1839. Thoreau did not find a publisher for the book and instead printed 1,000 copies at his own expense; fewer than 300 were sold. He self-published on the advice of Emerson, using Emerson's publisher, Munroe, who did little to publicize the book.

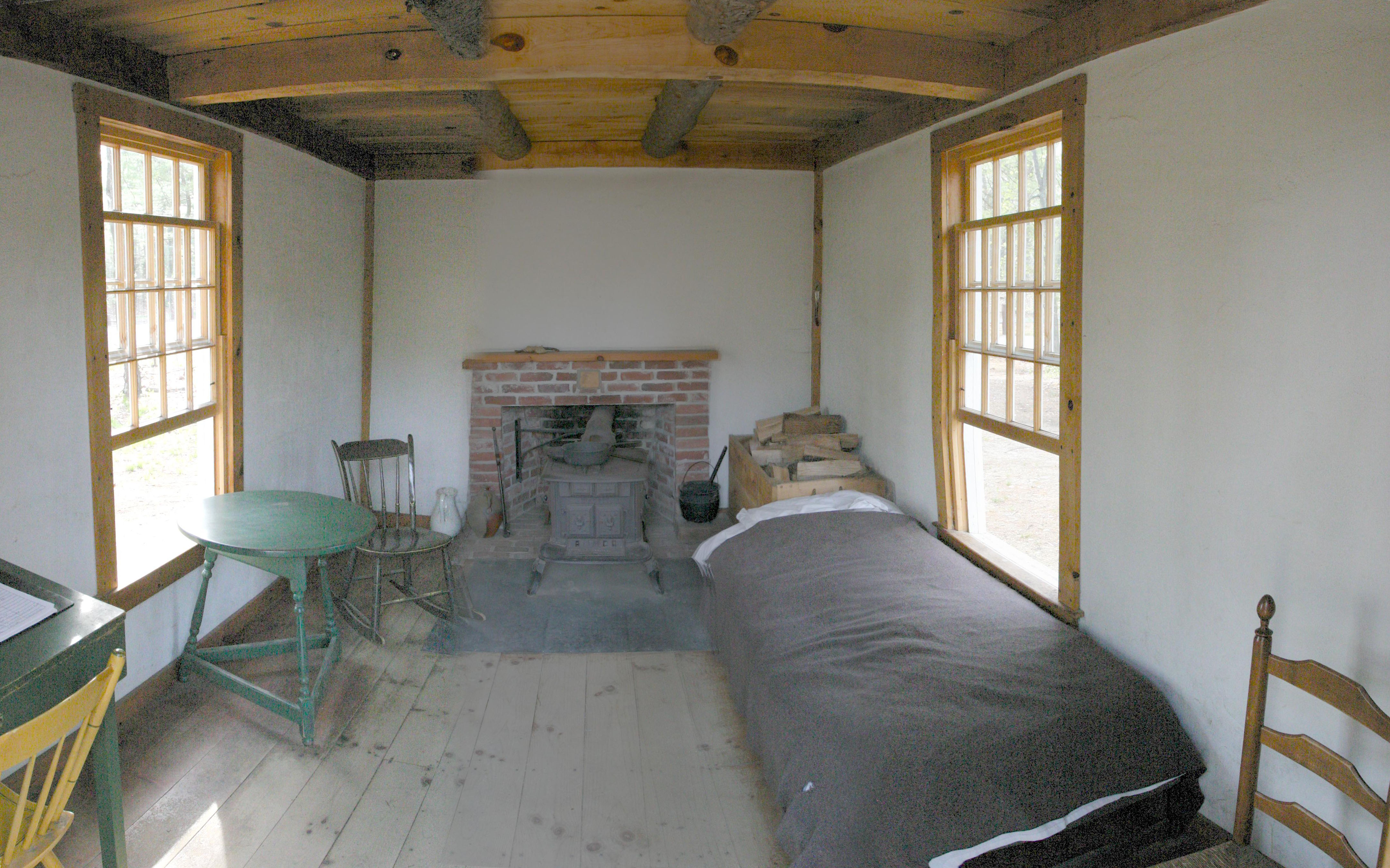
Reconstruction of the interior of Thoreau's cabin

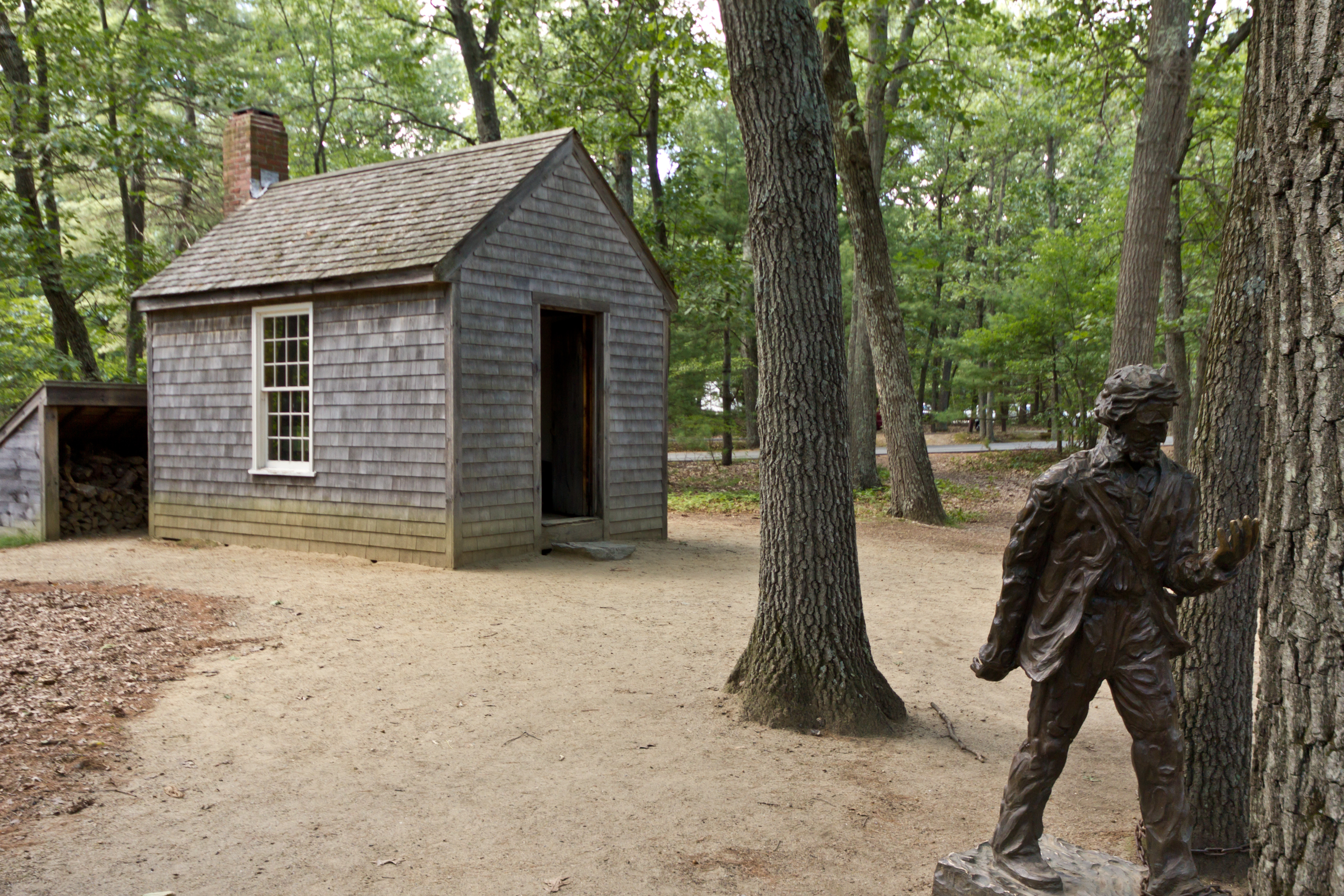
Replica of Thoreau's cabin and a statue of him near Walden Pond

In August 1846, Thoreau briefly left Walden to make a trip to Mount Katahdin in Maine, a journey that was later recorded in "Ktaadn", the first part of The Maine Woods.

Thoreau left Walden Pond on September 6, 1847. At Emerson's request, he immediately moved back to the Emerson house to help Emerson's wife, Lidian, manage the household while her husband was on an extended trip to Europe. Over several years, as he worked to pay off his debts, he continuously revised the manuscript of what he eventually published as Walden, or Life in the Woods in 1854, recounting the two years, two months, and two days he had spent at Walden Pond. The book compresses that time into a single calendar year, using the passage of the four seasons to symbolize human development. Part memoir and part spiritual quest, Walden at first won few admirers, but later critics have regarded it as a classic American work that explores natural simplicity, harmony, and beauty as models for just social and cultural conditions.

The American poet Robert Frost wrote of Thoreau, "In one book ... he surpasses everything we have had in America."

The American author John Updike said of the book, "A century and a half after its publication, Walden has become such a totem of the back-to-nature, preservationist, anti-business, civil-disobedience mindset, and Thoreau so vivid a protester, so perfect a crank and hermit saint, that the book risks being as revered and unread as the Bible."

Thoreau moved out of Emerson's house in July 1848 and stayed at a house on nearby Belknap Street. In 1850, he moved into a house at 255 Main Street, where he lived until his death.

In the summer of 1850, Thoreau and Channing journeyed from Boston to Montreal and Quebec City. These would be Thoreau's only travels outside the United States. It is as a result of this trip that he developed lectures that eventually became A Yankee in Canada. He jested that all he got from this adventure "was a cold".

=== Later years, 1851–1862 ===
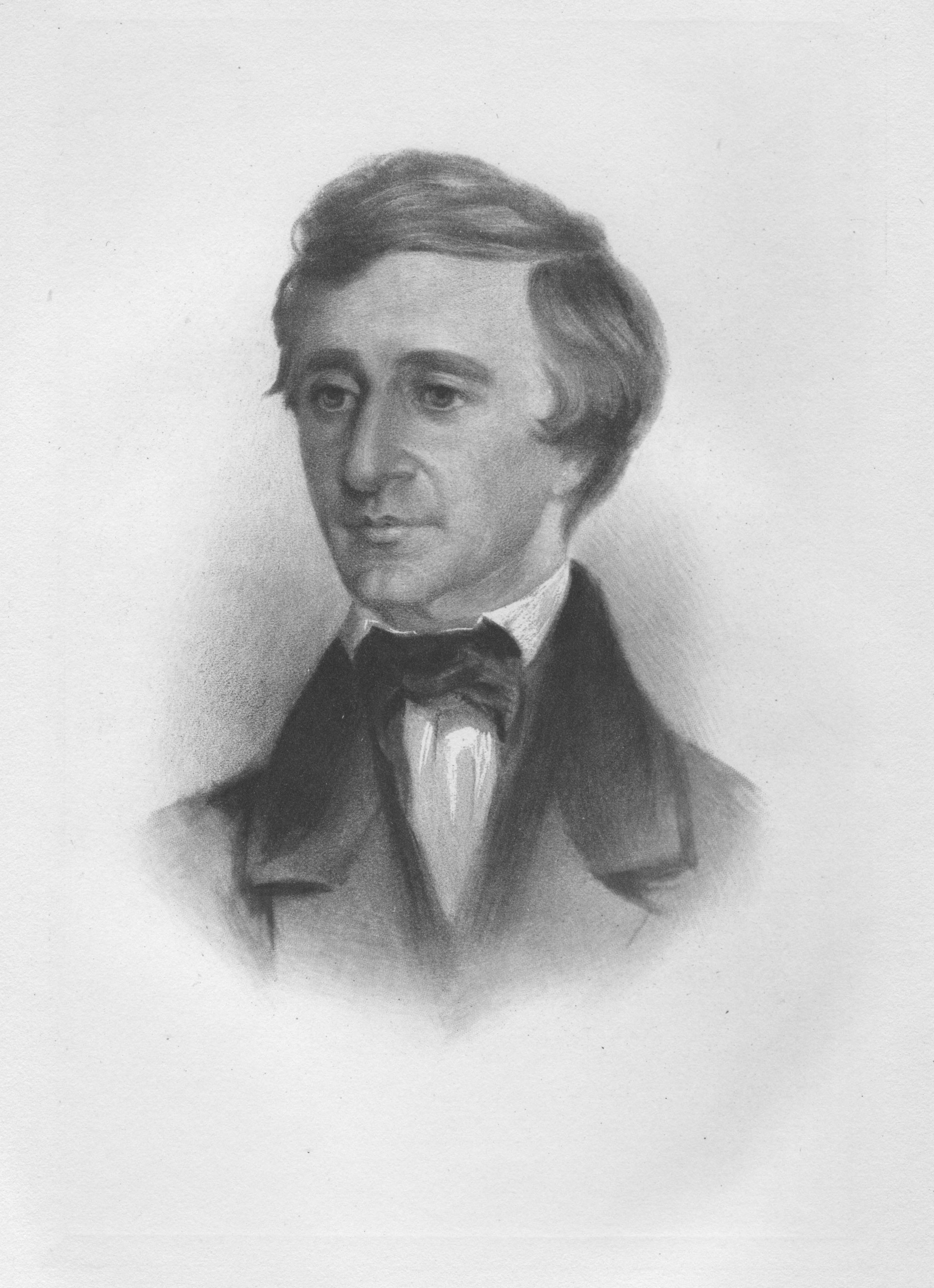
Thoreau in 1854

In 1851, Thoreau became increasingly fascinated with natural history and narratives of travel and expedition. He read avidly on botany and often wrote observations on this topic into his journal. He admired William Bartram and Charles Darwin's Voyage of the Beagle. He kept detailed observations on Concord's nature lore, recording everything from how the fruit ripened over time to the fluctuating depths of Walden Pond and the days certain birds migrated. The point of this task was to "anticipate" the seasons of nature, in his word.

He became a land surveyor and continued to write increasingly detailed observations on the natural history of the town, covering an area of 26 square miles (67 square kilometers), in his journal, a two-million-word document he kept for 24 years. He also kept a series of notebooks, and these observations became the source of his late writings on natural history, such as "Autumnal Tints", "The Succession of Trees", and "Wild Apples", an essay lamenting the destruction of the local wild apple species.

With the rise of environmental history and ecocriticism as academic disciplines, several new readings of Thoreau began to emerge, showing him to have been both a philosopher and an analyst of ecological patterns in fields and woodlots. For instance, "The Succession of Forest Trees", shows that he used experimentation and analysis to explain how forests regenerate after fire or human destruction, through the dispersal of seeds by winds or animals. In this lecture, first presented to a cattle show in Concord, and considered his greatest contribution to ecology, Thoreau explained why one species of tree can grow in a place where a different tree did previously. He observed that squirrels often carry nuts far from the tree from which they fell to create stashes. These seeds are likely to germinate and grow should the squirrel die or abandon the stash. He credited the squirrel for performing a "great service ... in the economy of the universe."

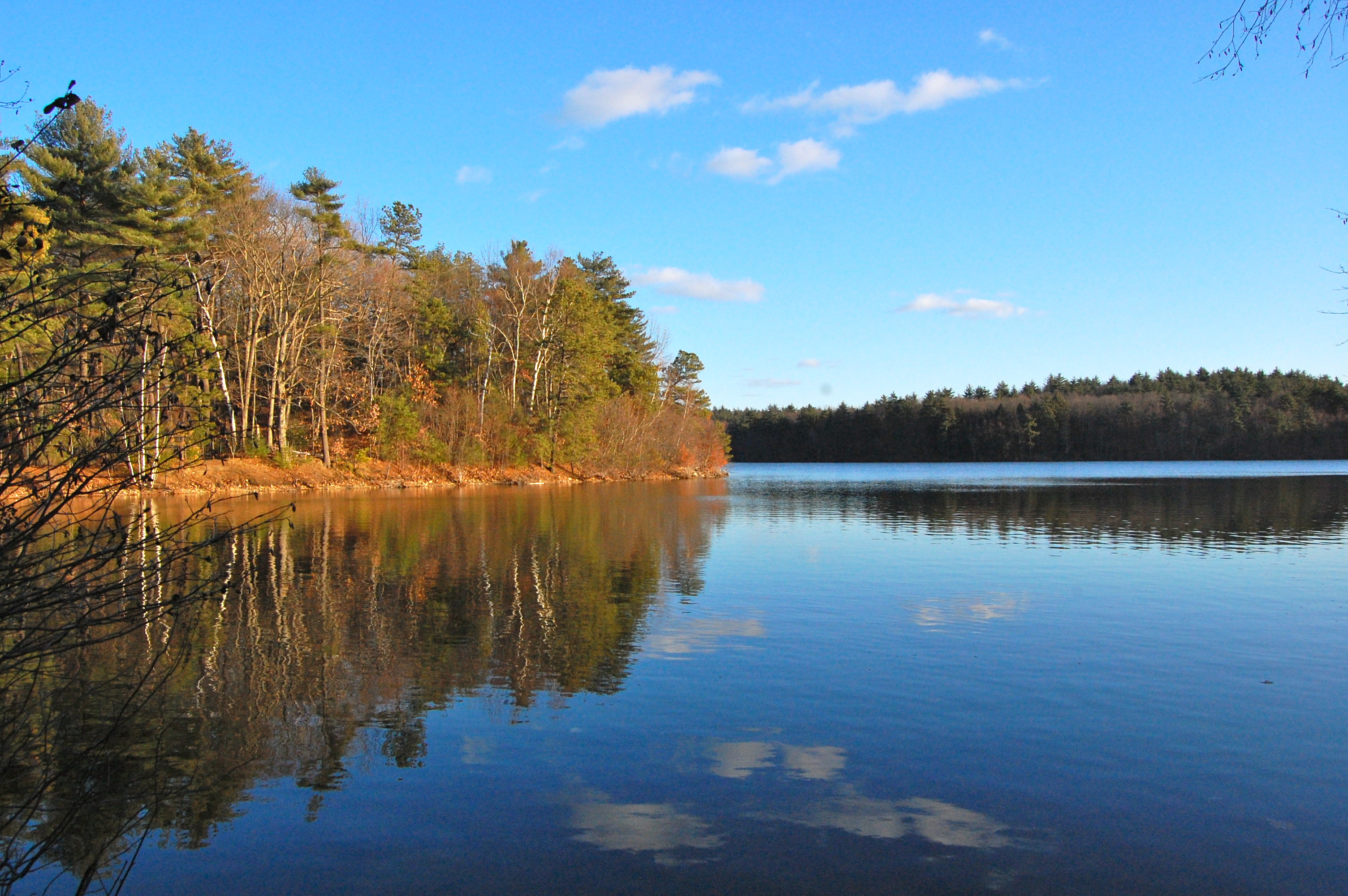
Walden Pond

He traveled to Canada East once, Cape Cod four times, and Maine three times; these landscapes inspired his "excursion" books, A Yankee in Canada, Cape Cod, and The Maine Woods, in which travel itineraries frame his thoughts about geography, history and philosophy. Other travels took him southwest to Philadelphia and New York City in 1854 and west across the Great Lakes region in 1861, when he visited Niagara Falls, Detroit, Chicago, Milwaukee, St. Paul and Mackinac Island. He was provincial in his own travels, but he read widely about travel in other lands. He devoured all the first-hand travel accounts available in his day, at a time when the last unmapped regions of the earth were being explored. He read Magellan and James Cook; the arctic explorers John Franklin, Alexander Mackenzie and William Parry; David Livingstone and Richard Francis Burton on Africa; Lewis and Clark; and hundreds of lesser-known works by explorers and literate travelers. Astonishing amounts of reading fed his endless curiosity about the peoples, cultures, religions and natural history of the world and left its traces as commentaries in his voluminous journals. He processed everything he read, in the local laboratory of his Concord experience. Among his famous aphorisms is his advice to "live at home like a traveler".

After John Brown's raid on Harpers Ferry, many prominent voices in the abolitionist movement distanced themselves from Brown or damned him with faint praise. Thoreau was disgusted by this, and he composed a key speech, "A Plea for Captain John Brown", which was uncompromising in its defense of Brown and his actions. Thoreau's speech proved persuasive: the abolitionist movement began to accept Brown as a martyr, and by the time of the American Civil War entire armies of the North were literally singing Brown's praises. As a biographer of Brown put it, "If, as Alfred Kazin suggests, without John Brown there would have been no Civil War, we would add that without the Concord Transcendentalists, John Brown would have had little cultural impact."

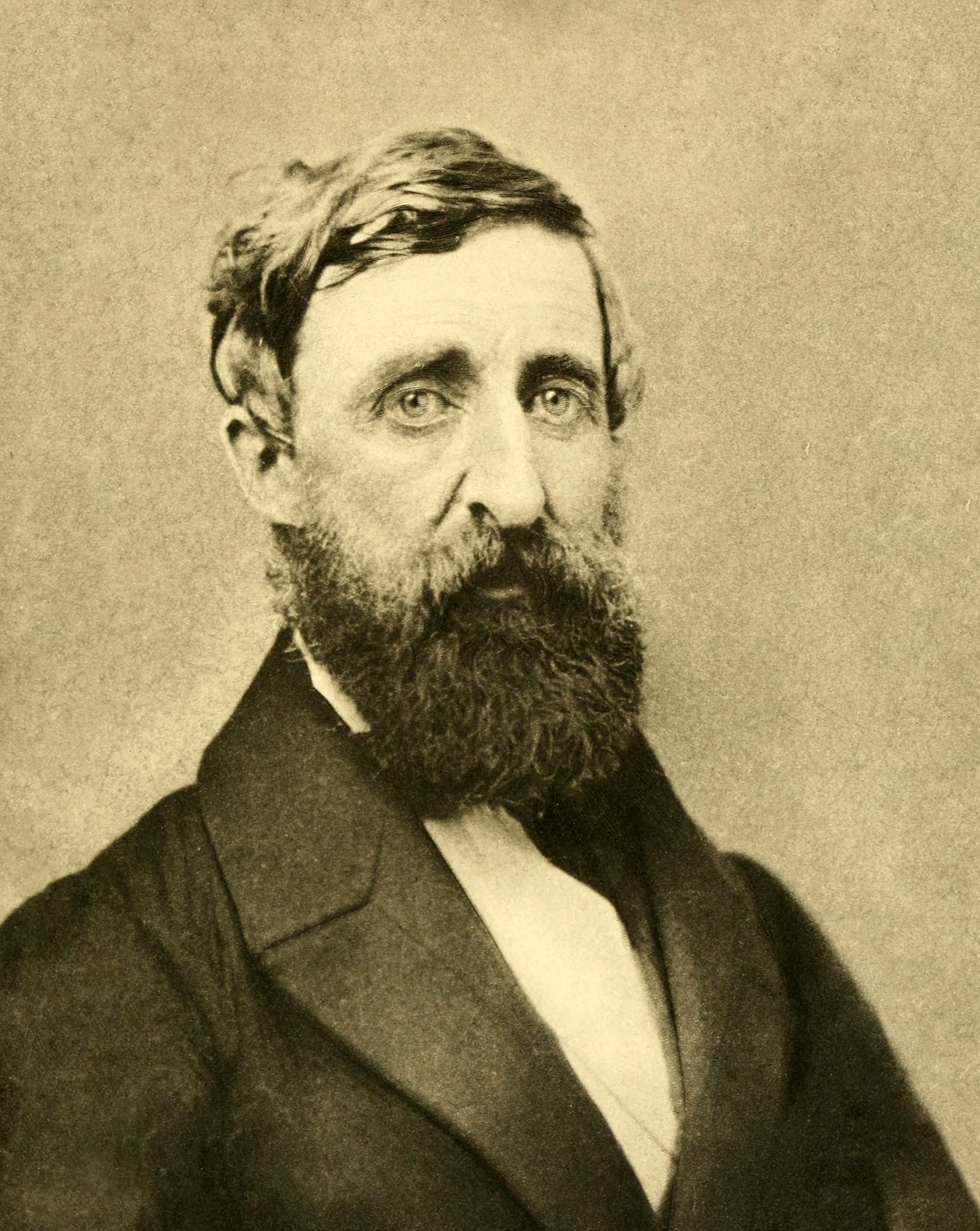
Thoreau in his second and final photographic sitting, August 1861.

=== Tuberculosis and death ===
Thoreau contracted tuberculosis in 1835 and suffered from it sporadically afterwards. In 1860, following a late-night excursion to count the rings of tree stumps during a rainstorm, he became ill with bronchitis. His health declined, with brief periods of remission, and he eventually became bedridden. Recognizing the terminal nature of his disease, Thoreau spent his last years revising and editing his unpublished works, particularly The Maine Woods and Excursions, and petitioning publishers to print revised editions of A Week and Walden. He wrote letters and journal entries until he became too weak to continue. His friends were alarmed at his diminished appearance and they were fascinated by his tranquil acceptance of death. When he was asked in his last weeks if he had made his peace with God, Thoreau responded, "I did not know we had ever quarreled."

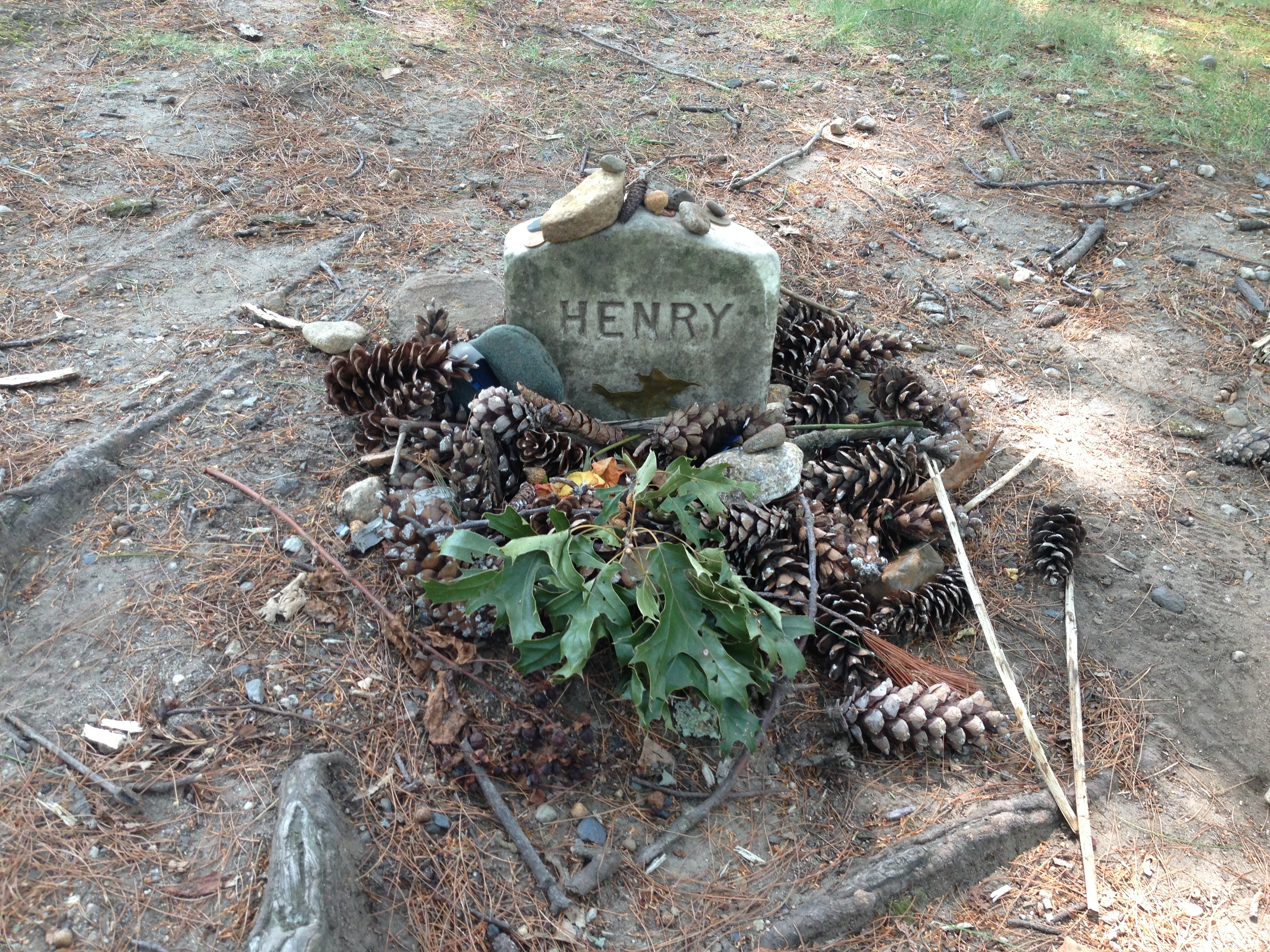
Grave of Thoreau at Sleepy Hollow Cemetery in Concord

Aware that he was dying, Thoreau's last words were "Now comes good sailing", followed by two lone words, "moose" and "Indian". He died on May 6, 1862, at the age of 44. Amos Bronson Alcott planned the service and read selections from Thoreau's works, and Channing presented a hymn. Emerson wrote the eulogy spoken at the funeral. Thoreau was buried in the Dunbar family plot; his remains and those of members of his immediate family were eventually moved to Sleepy Hollow Cemetery in Concord, Massachusetts.

=== "Life Without Principle" final works and legacy ===
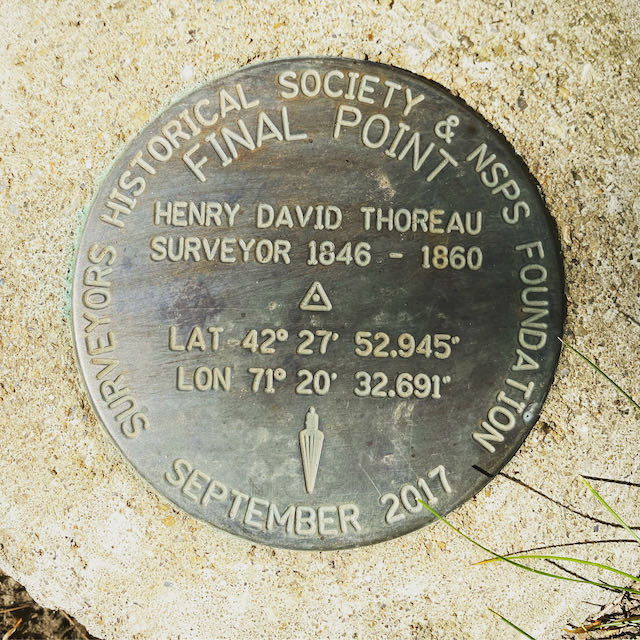
Geodetic Marker at Thoreau's gravesite

Thoreau prepared "Life Without Principle" for publication during the final months of his life based on his journal notes between 1851 and 1855 that originally inspired his lecture. It was published posthumously in 1863 in The Atlantic Monthly. The ideas in this essay provide an overview of Thoreau's philosophy of work and life, challenging the notion that work is the most crucial aspect of an individual's life. He emphasizes the need for the act of doing the work itself, and doing it well, to be fulfilling for the laborer, and not merely something that is done in exchange for a wage or profit. He posits also that spending your life working purely for these reasons is a waste of one's time and, thus, life. During this same middle passage of "Life Without Principle" Thoreau connects how market forces and capital trade influence a system that does not encourage or promote skill or experience in the work being done, rather quite the opposite. He gives example in the fact that, in his own work as a surveyor, he is often asked by employers not to do the job skillfully or accurately but in a way that most benefits them. He addresses, also, a firewood hawker with whom he tried to share a new more accurate way of measuring a cord of wood who told him that the more accurately he measured the wood, the more business he would lose as clients similarly preferred less skill and accuracy in measuring as they thought that this might net them some advantage in the error.

"The ways by which you may get money almost without exception lead downward. To have done anything by which you earned money merely is to have been truly idle or worse. If the laborer gets no more than the wages which his employer pays him, he is cheated, he cheats himself. If you would get money as a writer or lecturer, you must be popular, which is to go down perpendicularly. Those services which the community will most readily pay for it is most disagreeable to render. You are paid for being something less than a man. The State does not commonly reward a genius any more wisely.

Even the poet-laureate would rather not have to celebrate the accidents of royalty. He must be bribed with a pipe of wine; and perhaps another poet is called away from his muse to gauge that very pipe. As for my own business, even that kind of surveying which I could do with most satisfaction my employers do not want. They would prefer that I should do my work coarsely and not too well, ay, not well enough. When I observe that there are different ways of surveying, my employer commonly asks which will give him the most land, not which is most correct. I once invented a rule for measuring cord-wood, and tried to introduce it in Boston; but the measurer there told me that the sellers did not wish to have their wood measured correctly,—that he was already too accurate for them, and therefore they commonly got their wood measured in Charlestown before crossing the bridge.

The aim of the laborer should be, not to get his living, to get "a good job," but to perform well a certain work; and, even in a pecuniary sense, it would be economy for a town to pay its laborers so well that they would not feel that they were working for low ends, as for a livelihood merely, but for scientific, or even moral ends. Do not hire a man who does your work for money, but him who does it for love of it.

It is remarkable that there are few men so well employed, so much to their minds, but that a little money or fame would commonly buy them off from their present pursuit. I see advertisements for active young men, as if activity were the whole of a young man's capital. Yet I have been surprised when one has with confidence proposed to me, a grown man, to embark in some enterprise of his, as if I had absolutely nothing to do, my life having been a complete failure hitherto. What a doubtful compliment this is to pay me! As if he had met me half-way across the ocean beating up against the wind, but bound nowhere, and proposed to me to go along with him! If I did, what do you think the underwriters would say? No, no! I am not without employment at this stage of the voyage. To tell the truth, I saw an advertisement for able-bodied seamen, when I was a boy, sauntering in my native port, and as soon as I came of age I embarked."

"Life Without Principle" also touches on his ideas and final philosophical contributions to Welfarism, humanism, passive media consumption, economic materialism, and empirical naturalism.

In addition to "Life Without Principle", Thoreau was writing and reworking several other lectures and essays for publication in the final months of his life, including "Walking", "Wild Apples", and "Autumnal Tints".

== Ideas ==
=== Nature and human existence ===
Most of the luxuries and many of the so-called comforts of life are not only not indispensable, but positive hindrances to the elevation of mankind.

— Thoreau

Similar to other Transcendentalists, Thoreau saw the natural world itself and one's presence in it as the answer to mankind's search for higher power. In the “Friday” chapter of A Week on the Concord and Merrimack Rivers, he posits, “Is not Nature, rightly read, that of which she is commonly taken to be the symbol merely?” Noting too in other journal entries that he was always intent “to be always on the alert to find God in nature”

In "Higher Laws," a central chapter of Walden, Thoreau outlines claims that human beings have a dual nature, part spiritual and part animal. Detailing that humanity is supposed to exercise and nourish the spiritual part, not the animal part.

Thoreau was an early advocate of recreational hiking and canoeing, of conserving natural resources on private land, and of preserving wilderness as public land. He was a highly skilled canoeist; Nathaniel Hawthorne, after a ride with him, noted that "Mr. Thoreau managed the boat so perfectly, either with two paddles or with one, that it seemed instinct with his own will, and to require no physical effort to guide it."

He was not a strict vegetarian, though he said he preferred that diet and advocated it as a means of self-improvement. He wrote in Walden, "The practical objection to animal food in my case was its uncleanness; and besides, when I had caught and cleaned and cooked and eaten my fish, they seemed not to have fed me essentially. It was insignificant and unnecessary, and cost more than it came to. A little bread or a few potatoes would have done as well, with less trouble and filth."

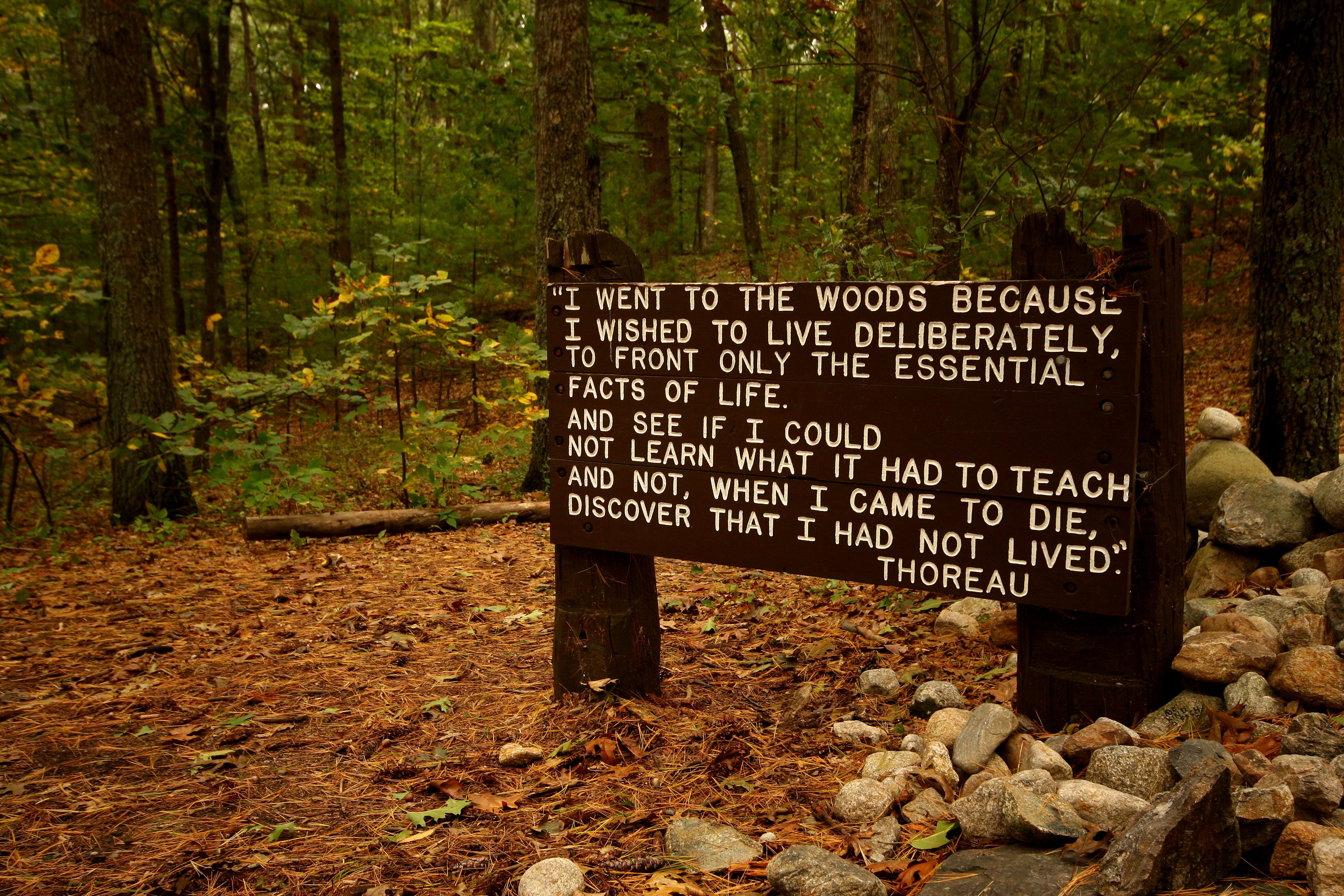
Thoreau's famous quotation, near his cabin site at Walden Pond

Thoreau neither rejected civilization nor fully embraced wilderness. Instead, he sought a middle ground, the pastoral realm that integrates nature and culture. His philosophy required that he be a didactic arbitrator between the wilderness he based so much on and the spreading mass of humanity in North America. He decried the latter endlessly but felt that a teacher needs to be close to those who needed to hear what he wanted to tell them. The wilderness he enjoyed was the nearby swamp or forest, and he preferred "partially cultivated country". His idea of being "far in the recesses of the wilderness" of Maine was to "travel the logger's path and the Indian trail", but he also hiked on pristine land.

In an essay titled "Henry David Thoreau, Philosopher", environmental historian Roderick Nash wrote, "Thoreau left Concord in 1846 for the first of three trips to northern Maine. His expectations were high because he hoped to find genuine, primeval America. But contact with real wilderness in Maine affected him far differently than had the idea of wilderness in Concord. Instead of coming out of the woods with a deepened appreciation of the wilds, Thoreau felt a greater respect for civilization and realized the necessity of balance."

On alcohol, Thoreau wrote, "I would fain keep sober always. ... I believe that water is the only drink for a wise man; wine is not so noble a liquor. ... Of all ebriosity, who does not prefer to be intoxicated by the air he breathes?"

=== Politics ===
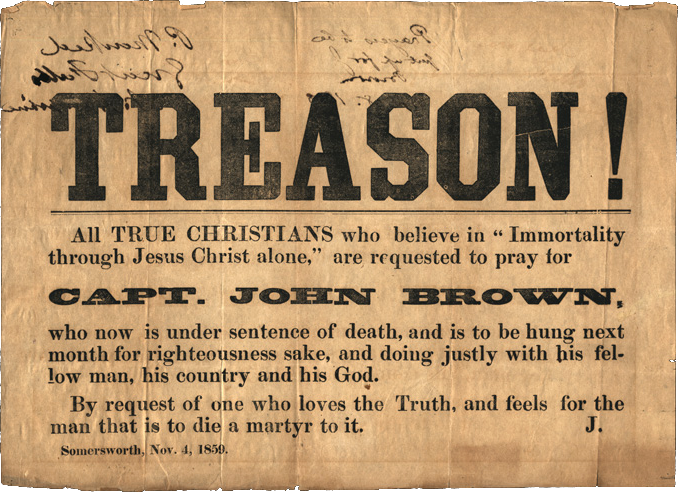
John Brown "Treason" Broadside, 1859

Thoreau was fervently against slavery and he actively supported the abolitionist movement. He participated as a conductor in the Underground Railroad, delivered lectures that attacked the Fugitive Slave Law, and in opposition to the popular opinion of the time, supported radical abolitionist militia leader John Brown and his party. Two weeks after the ill-fated raid on Harpers Ferry and in the weeks leading up to Brown's execution, Thoreau delivered a speech to the citizens of Concord, Massachusetts, in which he compared the American government to Pontius Pilate and likened Brown's execution to the crucifixion of Jesus Christ:

Some eighteen hundred years ago Christ was crucified; this morning, perchance, Captain Brown was hung. These are the two ends of a chain which is not without its links. He is not Old Brown any longer; he is an angel of light.

In "The Last Days of John Brown", Thoreau described the words and deeds of John Brown as noble and an example of heroism. In addition, he lamented the newspaper editors who dismissed Brown and his scheme as "crazy".

Thoreau was a proponent of limited government and individualism. Although he was hopeful that mankind could potentially have, through self-betterment, the kind of government which "governs not at all", he distanced himself from contemporary "no-government men" (anarchists), writing: "I ask for, not at once no government, but at once a better government."

Thoreau believed that the evolution from absolute monarchy to limited monarchy to democracy was "a progress toward true respect for the individual" and he theorized about further improvements "towards recognizing and organizing the rights of man". Echoing this belief, he went on to write: "There will never be a really free and enlightened State until the State comes to recognize the individual as a higher and independent power, from which all its power and authority are derived, and treats him accordingly."

It is on this basis that Thoreau could so strongly inveigh against the British administration and Catholicism in A Yankee in Canada. Despotic authority, Thoreau argued, had crushed the people's sense of ingenuity and enterprise; the Canadian habitants had been reduced, in his view, to a perpetual childlike state. Ignoring the recent rebellions, he argued that there would be no revolution in the St. Lawrence River valley.

Although Thoreau believed that resistance to unjustly exercised authority could be both violent (exemplified in his support for John Brown) and nonviolent (his own example of tax resistance as described in "Resistance to Civil Government"), he regarded pacifist nonresistance as a temptation to passivity, writing: "Let not our Peace be proclaimed by the rust on our swords, or our inability to draw them from their scabbards; but let her at least have so much work on her hands as to keep those swords bright and sharp." Furthermore, in a formal lyceum debate in 1841, he debated the subject "Is it ever proper to offer forcible resistance?", arguing the affirmative.

Likewise, his condemnation of the Mexican–American War did not stem from pacifism, instead, it stemmed from his belief that Mexico was "unjustly overrun and conquered by a foreign army" as a means to expand the slave territory.

Thoreau was ambivalent about industrialization and capitalism. On one hand, he regarded commerce as "unexpectedly confident and serene, adventurous, and unwearied" and expressed admiration for its associated cosmopolitanism, writing:

I am refreshed and expanded when the freight train rattles past me, and I smell the stores which go dispensing their odors all the way from Long Wharf to Lake Champlain, reminding me of foreign parts, of coral reefs, and Indian oceans, and tropical climes, and the extent of the globe. I feel more like a citizen of the world at the sight of the palm-leaf which will cover so many flaxen New England heads the next summer

On the other hand, he wrote disparagingly of the factory system:

I cannot believe that our factory system is the best mode by which men may get clothing. The condition of the operatives is becoming every day more like that of the English; and it cannot be wondered at, since, as far as I have heard or observed, the principal object is, not that mankind may be well and honestly clad, but, unquestionably, that the corporations may be enriched.

Thoreau also favored the protection of animals and wild areas, free trade, and taxation for schools and highways, and espoused views that at least in part align with what is today known as bioregionalism. He disapproved of the subjugation of Native Americans, slavery, philistinism, technological utopianism, and what can be regarded in today's terms as consumerism, mass entertainment, and frivolous applications of technology.

=== Intellectual interests, influences, and affinities ===
==== Indian sacred texts and philosophy ====
Thoreau was influenced by Indian spiritual thought. In Walden, there are many overt references to the sacred texts of India. For example, in the first chapter ("Economy"), he writes: "How much more admirable the Bhagvat-geeta than all the ruins of the East!" American Philosophy: An Encyclopedia classes him as one of several figures who "took a more pantheist or pandeist approach by rejecting views of God as separate from the world", also a characteristic of Hinduism.

Furthermore, in "The Pond in Winter", he equates Walden Pond with the sacred Ganges river, writing:

In the morning I bathe my intellect in the stupendous and cosmogonal philosophy of the Bhagvat Geeta since whose composition years of the gods have elapsed, and in comparison with which our modern world and its literature seem puny and trivial; and I doubt if that philosophy is not to be referred to a previous state of existence, so remote is its sublimity from our conceptions. I lay down the book and go to my well for water, and lo! there I meet the servant of the Brahmin, priest of Brahma and Vishnu and Indra, who still sits in his temple on the Ganges reading the Vedas, or dwells at the root of a tree with his crust and water jug. I meet his servant come to draw water for his master, and our buckets as it were grate together in the same well. The pure Walden water is mingled with the sacred water of the Ganges.

Thoreau was aware his Ganges imagery could have been factual. He wrote about ice harvesting at Walden Pond. And he knew that New England's ice merchants were shipping ice to foreign ports, including Calcutta.

Additionally, Thoreau followed various Hindu customs, including a diet largely consisting of rice ("It was fit that I should live on rice, mainly, who loved so well the philosophy of India."), flute playing (reminiscent of the favorite musical pastime of Krishna), and yoga.

In an 1849 letter to his friend H.G.O. Blake, he wrote about yoga and its meaning to him:

Free in this world as the birds in the air, disengaged from every kind of chains, those who practice yoga gather in Brahma the certain fruits of their works. Depend upon it that, rude and careless as I am, I would fain practice the yoga faithfully. The yogi, absorbed in contemplation, contributes in his degree to creation; he breathes a divine perfume, he hears wonderful things. Divine forms traverse him without tearing him, and united to the nature which is proper to him, he goes, he acts as animating original matter. To some extent, and at rare intervals, even I am a yogi.

==== Biology ====
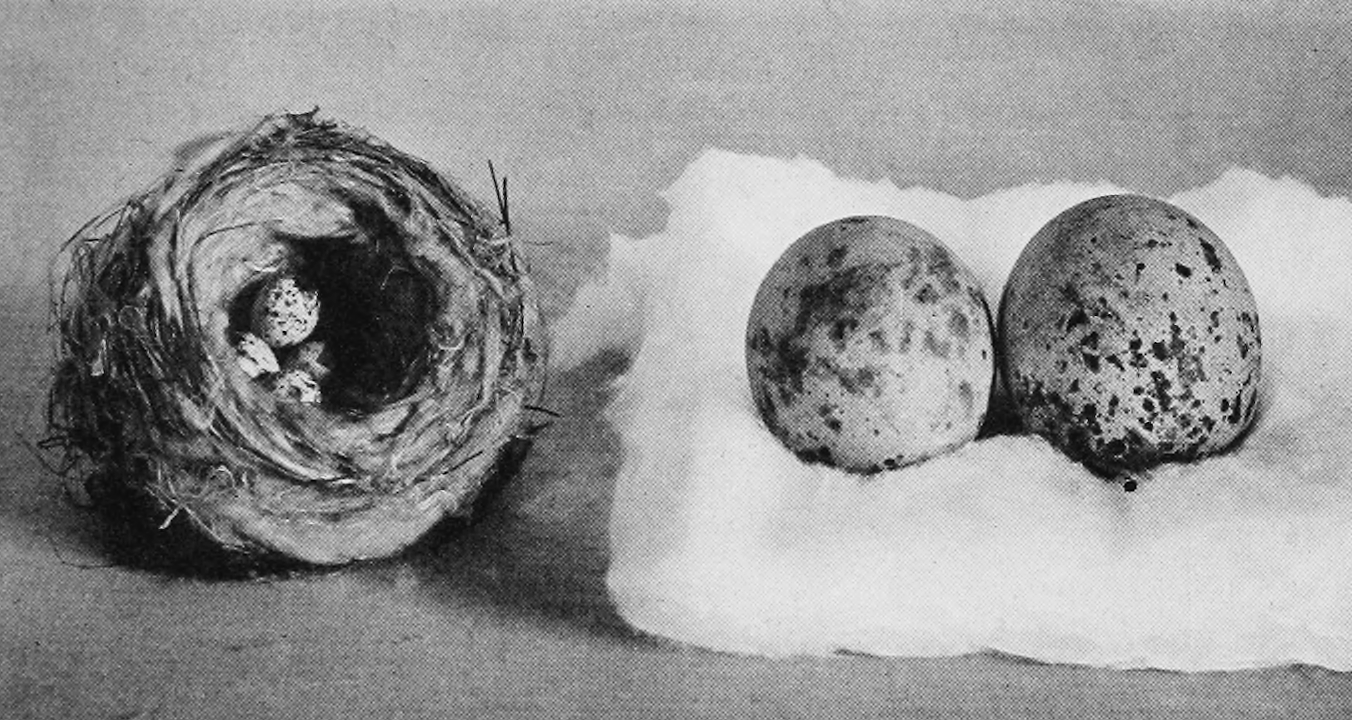
Bird eggs found by Thoreau and given to the Boston Society of Natural History. Those in the nest are of yellow warbler, the other two of red-tailed hawk.

Thoreau read contemporary works in the new science of biology, including the works of Alexander von Humboldt, Charles Darwin, and Asa Gray (Charles Darwin's staunchest American ally). Thoreau was deeply influenced by Humboldt, especially his work Cosmos.

In 1859, Thoreau purchased and read Darwin's On the Origin of Species. Unlike many natural historians at the time, including Louis Agassiz who publicly opposed Darwinism in favor of a static view of nature, Thoreau was immediately enthusiastic about the theory of evolution by natural selection and endorsed it, stating:

The development theory implies a greater vital force in Nature, because it is more flexible and accommodating, and equivalent to a sort of constant new creation. (A quote from On the Origin of Species follows this sentence.)

== Identity ==
=== Sexuality ===
Thoreau never married and he was also childless. In 1840, when he was 23, he proposed to eighteen-year-old Ellen Sewall, but she refused him, on the advice of her father. Sophia Foord proposed to him, but he rejected her.

Thoreau's sexuality has long been the subject of speculation, including by his contemporaries. Critics have called him heterosexual, homosexual, or asexual. There is no evidence to suggest he had physical relations with anyone, man or woman. Bronson Alcott wrote that Thoreau "seemed to have no temptations. All those strong wants that do battle with other men's nature, he knew not." Some scholars have suggested that homoerotic sentiments run through his writings and concluded that he was homosexual. The elegy "Sympathy" was inspired by the eleven-year-old Edmund Sewall, who had just spent five days in the Thoreau household in 1839. One scholar has suggested that he wrote the poem to Edmund because he could not bring himself to write it to Edmund's sister Anna, and another that Thoreau's "emotional experiences with women are memorialized under a camouflage of masculine pronouns", but other scholars dismiss this. It has been argued that the long paean in Walden to the French-Canadian woodchopper Alek Therien, which includes allusions to Achilles and Patroclus, is an expression of conflicted desire. In some of Thoreau's writing there is the sense of a secret self. In 1840 he writes in his journal: "My friend is the apology for my life. In him are the spaces which my orbit traverses". Thoreau was strongly influenced by the moral reformers of his time, and this may have instilled anxiety and guilt over sexual desire.

=== Parallels with the autistic experience ===
While Henry David Thoreau lived too early to be formally evaluated for autism spectrum disorder (ASD) or another related condition, some people in the autistic community strongly identify with Thoreau's lived experience, as described in his essays. It is speculated that Thoreau may have had ASD himself; Julie Brown, author of "Writers on the Spectrum: How Autism and Asperger's Syndrome Have Influenced Literary Writing", claims that Thoreau "demonstrated so many traits of Asperger's Syndrome (AS) that it seems very likely that he was affected by it". Brown specifically names Thoreau's social difficulties and his desire for solitude, his strict routines and his desire for sameness, his formation of his identity through his oppositional behavior, and his restrictive and intense interests, citing examples from Thoreau's essays.

For example, in Walden, Thoreau describes the (perceived) superiority of a simple diet and a limited wardrobe, as well as his construction of a rather spartan living space in the woods; Brown connects these traits to the repetitive, simple diets and clothing of other people with Asperger's Syndrome, and he asserts that the small size and limited decoration of Thoreau's living space was a sign of his desire for consistency and simplicity, which she asserts are "rooted in his place on the autism spectrum".

== Influence ==
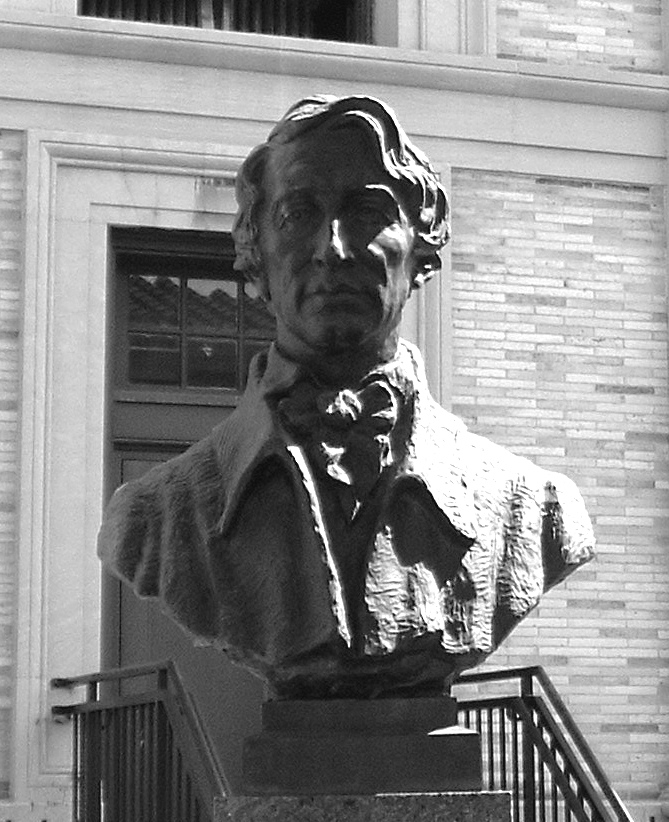
A bust of Thoreau from the Hall of Fame for Great Americans at the Bronx Community College

Thoreau's careful observations and devastating conclusions have rippled into time, becoming stronger as the weaknesses Thoreau noted have become more pronounced ... Events that seem to be completely unrelated to his stay at Walden Pond have been influenced by it, including the national park system, the British labor movement, the creation of India, the civil rights movement, the hippie revolution, the environmental movement, and the wilderness movement. Today, Thoreau's words are quoted with feeling by liberals, socialists, anarchists, libertarians, and conservatives alike.

— Ken Kifer, Analysis and Notes on Walden: Henry Thoreau's Text with Adjacent Thoreauvian Commentary

Thoreau's political writings had little influence during his lifetime, as "his contemporaries did not see him as a theorist or as a radical", viewing him instead as a naturalist. They either dismissed or ignored his political essays, including "Civil Disobedience". The only two complete books (as opposed to essays) that were published in his lifetime, Walden and A Week on the Concord and Merrimack Rivers (1849), both dealt with Nature, in which he "loved to wander". His obituary was lumped in with others, rather than as a separate article, in an 1862 yearbook. Critics and the public continued either to disdain or to ignore Thoreau for years, but the publication of extracts from his journal in the 1880s by his friend H.G.O. Blake, and of a definitive set of Thoreau's works by the Riverside Press between 1893 and 1906, led to the rise of what literary historian F.L. Pattee called a "Thoreau cult".

Thoreau's writings went on to influence many public figures. Political leaders and reformers like Mohandas Gandhi, U.S. President John F. Kennedy, American civil rights activist Martin Luther King Jr., U.S. Supreme Court Justice William O. Douglas, and Russian author Leo Tolstoy all spoke of being strongly affected by Thoreau's work, particularly "Civil Disobedience", as did "right-wing theorist Frank Chodorov [who] devoted an entire issue of his monthly, Analysis, to an appreciation of Thoreau".

Thoreau also influenced many artists and authors including Edward Abbey, Willa Cather, Marcel Proust, William Butler Yeats, Sinclair Lewis, Ernest Hemingway, Upton Sinclair, E. B. White, Lewis Mumford, Frank Lloyd Wright, Alexander Posey, and Gustav Stickley. Thoreau also influenced naturalists like John Burroughs, John Muir, E. O. Wilson, Edwin Way Teale, Joseph Wood Krutch, B. F. Skinner, David Brower, and Loren Eiseley, who Publishers Weekly called "the modern Thoreau".

Thoreau's friend William Ellery Channing published his first biography, Thoreau the Poet-Naturalist, in 1873. English writer Henry Stephens Salt wrote a biography of Thoreau in 1890, which popularized Thoreau's ideas in Britain: George Bernard Shaw, Edward Carpenter, and Robert Blatchford were among those who became Thoreau enthusiasts as a result of Salt's advocacy.

Mohandas Gandhi first read Walden in 1906, while working as a civil rights activist in Johannesburg, South Africa. Gandhi first read "Civil Disobedience" while he sat in a South African prison for the crime of nonviolently protesting discrimination against the Indian population in the Transvaal. The essay galvanized Gandhi, who wrote and published a synopsis of Thoreau's argument, calling what he termed its "incisive logic ... unanswerable" and referring to Thoreau as "one of the greatest and most moral men America has produced." He told American reporter Webb Miller, "[Thoreau's] ideas influenced me greatly. I adopted some of them and recommended the study of Thoreau to all of my friends who were helping me in the cause of Indian Independence. Why I actually took the name of my movement from Thoreau's essay 'On the Duty of Civil Disobedience', written about 80 years ago."

Martin Luther King Jr. noted in his autobiography that his first encounter with the idea of nonviolent resistance was reading "On Civil Disobedience" in 1944 while attending Morehouse College. He wrote in his autobiography that it was,

Here, in this courageous New Englander's refusal to pay his taxes and his choice of jail rather than support a war that would spread slavery's territory into Mexico, I made my first contact with the theory of nonviolent resistance. Fascinated by the idea of refusing to cooperate with an evil system, I was so deeply moved that I reread the work several times. I became convinced that noncooperation with evil is as much a moral obligation as is cooperation with good. No other person has been more eloquent and passionate in getting this idea across than Henry David Thoreau. As a result of his writings and personal witness, we are the heirs of a legacy of creative protest. The teachings of Thoreau came alive in our civil rights movement; indeed, they are more alive than ever before. Whether expressed in a sit-in at lunch counters; a freedom ride into Mississippi; a peaceful protest in Albany, Georgia; a bus boycott in Montgomery, Alabama; these are outgrowths of Thoreau's insistence that evil must be resisted and that no moral man can patiently adjust to injustice.

American psychologist B. F. Skinner wrote that he carried a copy of Thoreau's Walden with him in his youth. In Walden Two (published in 1948), Skinner wrote about a fictional utopian community of about 1,000 members inspired by the life of Henry Thoreau. Thoreau and his fellow Transcendentalists from Concord, Massachusetts were also a major inspiration for the American composer Charles Ives, whose 1915 Piano Sonata No. 2, known as the Concord Sonata, features "impressionistic pictures of Emerson and Thoreau", and includes a part for flute, Thoreau's instrument, in its 4th movement.

Actor Ron Thompson did a dramatic portrayal of Henry David Thoreau in the 1976 NBC television series The Rebels.

Thoreau's ideas have affected and resonated with various strains in the anarchist movement, with Emma Goldman referring to him as "the greatest American anarchist". Green anarchism and anarcho-primitivism in particular have both derived inspiration and ecological points-of-view from the writings of Thoreau. John Zerzan included Thoreau's text "Excursions" (1863) in his edited compilation of works in the anarcho-primitivist tradition titled Against civilization: Readings and reflections. Additionally, Murray Rothbard, the founder of anarcho-capitalism, has opined that Thoreau was one of the "great intellectual heroes" of his movement. Thoreau was also an important influence on late 19th-century anarchist naturism. Globally, Thoreau's concepts also held importance within individualist anarchist circles in Spain, France, and Portugal.

For the 200th anniversary of his birth, publishers released several new editions of his work: a recreation of Walden's 1902 edition with illustrations, a picture book with excerpts from Walden, and an annotated collection of Thoreau's essays on slavery. The United States Postal Service issued a commemorative stamp honoring Thoreau on May 23, 2017, in Concord, MA.

== Critical reception ==
Thoreau's work and career received little attention from his contemporaries until 1865, when the North American Review published James Russell Lowell's review of various papers by Thoreau that Emerson had collected and edited. Lowell's essay, Letters to Various Persons, which he republished as a chapter in his book, My Study Windows, derided Thoreau as a humorless poseur trafficking in commonplaces, a sentimentalist lacking in imagination, a "Diogenes in his barrel", resentfully criticizing what he could not attain. Lowell's caustic analysis influenced Scottish author Robert Louis Stevenson, who criticized Thoreau as a "skulker", saying "He did not wish virtue to go out of him among his fellow-men, but slunk into a corner to hoard it for himself."

Nathaniel Hawthorne had mixed feelings about Thoreau. He noted that "He is a keen and delicate observer of nature—a genuine observer—which, I suspect, is almost as rare a character as even an original poet; and Nature, in return for his love, seems to adopt him as her especial child, and shows him secrets which few others are allowed to witness." On the other hand, he also wrote that Thoreau "repudiated all regular modes of getting a living, and seems inclined to lead a sort of Indian life among civilized men".

In a similar vein, poet John Greenleaf Whittier detested what he deemed to be the "wicked" and "heathenish" message of Walden, claiming that Thoreau wanted man to "lower himself to the level of a woodchuck and walk on four legs".

In response to such criticisms, the English novelist George Eliot, writing decades later for the Westminster Review, characterized such critics as uninspired and narrow-minded:

People—very wise in their own eyes—who would have every man's life ordered according to a particular pattern, and who are intolerant of every existence the utility of which is not palpable to them, may pooh-pooh Mr. Thoreau and this episode in his history, as unpractical and dreamy.

Thoreau himself also responded to the criticism in a paragraph of his work Walden by highlighting what he felt was the irrelevance of their inquiries:

I should not obtrude my affairs so much on the notice of my readers if very particular inquiries had not been made by my townsmen concerning my mode of life, which some would call impertinent, though they do not appear to me at all impertinent, but, considering the circumstances, very natural and pertinent. Some have asked what I got to eat; if I did not feel lonesome; if I was not afraid; and the like. Others have been curious to learn what portion of my income I devoted to charitable purposes; and some, who have large families, how many poor children I maintained. ... Unfortunately, I am confined to this theme by the narrowness of my experience. Moreover, I, on my side, require of every writer, first or last, a simple and sincere account of his own life, and not merely what he has heard of other men's lives; ... I trust that none will stretch the seams in putting on the coat, for it may do good service to him whom it fits.

Recent criticism has accused Thoreau of hypocrisy, misanthropy, and being sanctimonious, based on his writings in Walden, although these criticisms have been regarded as highly selective.

== Selected works ==
Many of Thoreau's works were not published during his lifetime, including his journals and numerous unfinished manuscripts.

- "Aulus Persius Flaccus" (1840)
- The Service (1840)
- "A Walk to Wachusett" (1842)
- "Paradise (to be) Regained" (1843)
- "The Landlord" (1843)
- "Sir Walter Raleigh" (1844)
- "Herald of Freedom" (1844)
- "Wendell Phillips Before the Concord Lyceum" (1845)
- "Reform and the Reformers" (1846–48)
- "Thomas Carlyle and His Works" (1847)
- A Week on the Concord and Merrimack Rivers (1849)
- "Resistance to Civil Government", or "Civil Disobedience"", or "On the Duty of Civil Disobedience"" (1849)
- "An Excursion to Canada" (1853)
- "Slavery in Massachusetts" (1854)
- Walden (1854)
- "A Plea for Captain John Brown" (1859)
- "Remarks After the Hanging of John Brown" (1859)
- "The Last Days of John Brown" (1860)
- "Walking" (1862)
- "Autumnal Tints" (1862)
- "Wild Apples: The History of the Apple Tree" (1862)
- "The Fall of the Leaf" (1863)
- Excursions (1863)
- "Life Without Principle" (1863)
- "Night and Moonlight" (1863)
- "The Highland Light" (1864)
- The Maine Woods (1864)
- "Cape Cod" (1865)
- "Letters to Various Persons" (1865)
- A Yankee in Canada, with Anti-Slavery and Reform Papers (1866)
- "Early Spring in Massachusetts" (1881)
- "Summer" (1884)
- "Winter" (1888)
- "Autumn" (1892)
- Miscellanies (1894)
- Familiar Letters of Henry David Thoreau (1894)
- Poems of Nature (1895)
- Some Unpublished Letters of Henry D. and Sophia E. Thoreau (1898)
- The First and Last Journeys of Thoreau (1905)
- Journal of Henry David Thoreau (1906)
- The Correspondence of Henry David Thoreau edited by Walter Harding and Carl Bode (Washington Square: New York University Press, 1958)
- "The Bluebird Carries the Sky on His Back" (Stanyan, 1970)
- "The Dispersion of Seeds" published as Faith in a Seed (Island Press, 1993)
- The Indian Notebooks (1847–1861) selections by Richard F. Fleck
- Wild Fruits (Unfinished at his death, W.W. Norton, 1999)

== See also ==
- American philosophy
- List of American philosophers
- List of peace activists
- Thoreau Society
- Walden Woods Project
