= Peter Del Tredici =

American botanist and author

Peter Del Tredici is an American botanist and author. He is a former senior research scientist at Arnold Arboretum for 35 years and a lecturer at the Harvard Graduate School of Design. He was appointed curator of the Larz Anderson Bonsai Collection in 1982 and was editor of the journal Arnoldia from 1989 to 1992.

Del Tredici, a native Californian, earned a Bachelor of Arts degree in Zoology from University of California, Berkeley in 1968 and a Master of Arts in Biology from the University of Oregon in 1969, after which he moved to Boston where he established his career and earned his doctorate in Biology from Boston University in 1991. His thesis adviser was Richard Primack and his thesis topic was "The Evolution and Natural History of Ginkgo biloba L.". Research on this project extended over a three-year period and involved travel to eastern China (fall of 1989) and to South Carolina.

I consider 'weed' to be a politically incorrect term. There is no biological definition of the term weed. It's really a value judgment.

— Peter Del Tredici

Del Tredici is an advocate of a "radically practical" approach to urban plant life, holding that what some people see as a collection of undesirable plants should be viewed as a valuable ecosystem unique to the hostile habitat of the city, and he prefers the term "spontaneous" over "invasive" in describing these flora. Del Tredici is the author of Wild Urban Plants of the Northeast: A Field Guide, which catalogs and describes the many species of urban wildflowers, weeds, and other plants that flourish without human support, and in which he makes the case that they can be beneficial to the quality of urban life.

Del Tredici also studied the ginkgo (Ginkgo biloba) for decades. He was part of a 1989 expedition that found wild ginkgos in Tian Mu Shan Reserve, a notable find since this species had been long believed extinct in the wild. He demonstrated that ginkgo basal lignotubers develop from suppressed cotyledonary (embryonic leaf) buds – a resprouting mechanism activated under stress that, according to Del Tredici, helps explain the ginkgo's long survival as a species. He helped develop supporting evidence for the theory that the ginkgo's characteristic vile–smelling fruits are a mechanism to attract ingestion by carnivores, aiding the tree's propagation via scat, and developed experiments confirming that all aspects of the ginkgo's sexual reproductive cycle are strongly influenced by temperature.

Del Tredici also consulted for a French subsidiary of Schwabe Pharmaceutical which markets ginkgo–leaf extract as a memory aid. While Del Tredici applied his expertise on the botanical side of the operation, he was skeptical that the products are effective, and noted that rather than deriving from ancient Chinese medical wisdom, the idea of ginkgo as an effective health agent "began in a board room in Germany in the mid–1960s" and has resulted in "a big cash cow".

In 2013, Del Tredici was awarded a Veitch Memorial Medal, given by the Royal Horticultural Society for outstanding contribution to the advancement of the science, art, or practice of horticulture.

== Publications ==
Del Tredici has published scholarly articles in various journals, edited or co–edited books, and contributed sections to books. Works of which he is the author include:

Books

- Del Tredici, Peter (2010). Wild Urban Plants of the Northeast: A Field Guide. Cornell University Press. ISBN 978-0-8014-7458-3.
- Del Tredici, Peter (1984). St. George and the Pygmies: The Story of Tsuga Canadensis 'Minuta'. Theophrastus. ISBN 978-0-913728-35-2.
- Del Tredici, Peter (1983). A Giant Among the Dwarfs: The Mystery of Sargent's Weeping Hemlock. Theophrastus. ISBN 978-0-913728-34-5.

Popular articles

- Peter Del Tredici (March 2010). "The Asphalt Jungle" (PDF). Natural History.
- Peter Del Tredici (July–August 2006). "The Other Kinsey Report". Natural History.
- Peter Del Tredici (Spring–Summer 2004). "Neocreationism and the Illusion of Ecological Restoration" (PDF). Harvard Design Magazine.

Scholarly articles

- Peter Del Tredici (2010) The Sand Pear—Pyrus pyrifolia. Arnoldia 67(4)
- Jianhua Li and Peter Del Tredici (2008), "The Chinese Parrotia: A Sibling Species of the Persian Parrotia" (PDF), Arnoldia, 66 (1): 5, ISSN 0004-2633, archived from the original (PDF) on 2010-08-03

Other

- Peter Del Tredici (September 9–13, 2010). "A Primer on Urban Ecology" (PDF). ASLA 2010 Annual Meeting and Expo. American Society of Landscape Architects.
