= Primack =

Primack is a surname. Notable people with the surname include:

- Brian A. Primack (born 1969), dean of the College of Health of Oregon State University, medical researcher, author and speaker
- Joel Primack (1945–2025), American physicist
- Richard Primack (born 1950), American biologist and botanist
- Ryan Primack, lead guitarist of the band Poison the Well
