= Donald Wyman =

Donald Wyman (1904 — 6 December 1993) was an American horticulturist, the head of horticulture at Harvard University's Arnold Arboretum from 1935 to 1970.

He took a bachelor's degree in horticulture from Pennsylvania State College (1926) and a master's in forestry (1933), then a PhD in horticulture at Cornell University (1935). He joined the Arboretum in 1935 and served for six months without salary in the depths of the Great Depression before being named horticulturist in 1936. He was the author of many books, including Wyman's Gardening Encyclopedia (1971) and was a frequent contributor to the journal Arnoldia. Wyman served as president, director, and trustee of the American Horticultural Society.

At the Arnold Arboretum he departed from the original method of planting by botanical association, to mark vistas and turns with specimen trees, and was energetic in acquiring seeds of many species that he introduced to American horticulture. He retired in 1970.

He received the George Robert White Medal from the Massachusetts Horticultural Society (1970), the Liberty Hyde Bailey Medal from the American Horticultural Society, the Veitch Memorial Medal from the Royal Horticultural Society (1969) and the Medal of Honor from the Garden Club of America (1965). The widely planted crabapple Malus "Donald Wyman" was named for him upon his retirement in 1970.

== Selected works ==
Aside from hundreds of professional articles in the Arboretum's journal Arnoldia he published

- Shrubs and Vines for American Gardens (1949, 3rd rev. ed 1969, 1971)
- Trees for American Gardens (1951, 1972, 1977, 1990)
- Wyman's Gardening Encyclopedia (1971, 1977, 1987) which, according to Amazon, has sold more than 100,000 copies.
- The Arnold Arboretum Garden Book (1954)
- Ground Cover Plants (1956)
- The Saturday Morning Gardener: A Guide to Once-A-Week Maintenance (1974)
- Dwarf Shrubs: Maintenance-free woody plants for today's gardens (1975)
