= A Different Drummer (novel) =

1962 debut novel by William Melville Kelley

- Bantam Books paperback edition
- Author: William Melvin Kelley
- Language: English
- Publisher: Doubleday
- Publication date: 1962
- OCLC: 1097440
- LC Class: PZ4.K284 Di

A Different Drummer is the 1962 debut novel of William Melvin Kelley. It won the John Hay Whitney Foundation Award and Rosenthal Foundation Award of the National Institute of Arts and Letters. The title references Henry David Thoreau's lines: "If a man does not keep pace with his companions, perhaps it is because he hears a different drummer..."

== Story ==
June 1957. One afternoon, in the backwater town of Sutton in an imaginary Southern state located between Mississippi and Alabama, a young black farmer, Tucker Caliban, matter-of-factly throws salt on his field, shoots his horse and livestock, sets fire to his house and leaves with his pregnant wife, starting an exodus of the entire African-American population from the state. The novel gives background and context to Caliban's act across a dozen chapters, each told from the perspective of different white townspersons.

== Structure ==
The original edition starts with an extended dedication (to the author's mother, his father and to "MSL"), and an epigraph (two separate stanzas from Walden by Henry David Thoreau, one of which includes the title of the book). The novel is divided into 11 titled chapters. The narrative is told from the viewpoint of the town's white inhabitants.
