= Sophia Thoreau =

American book editor

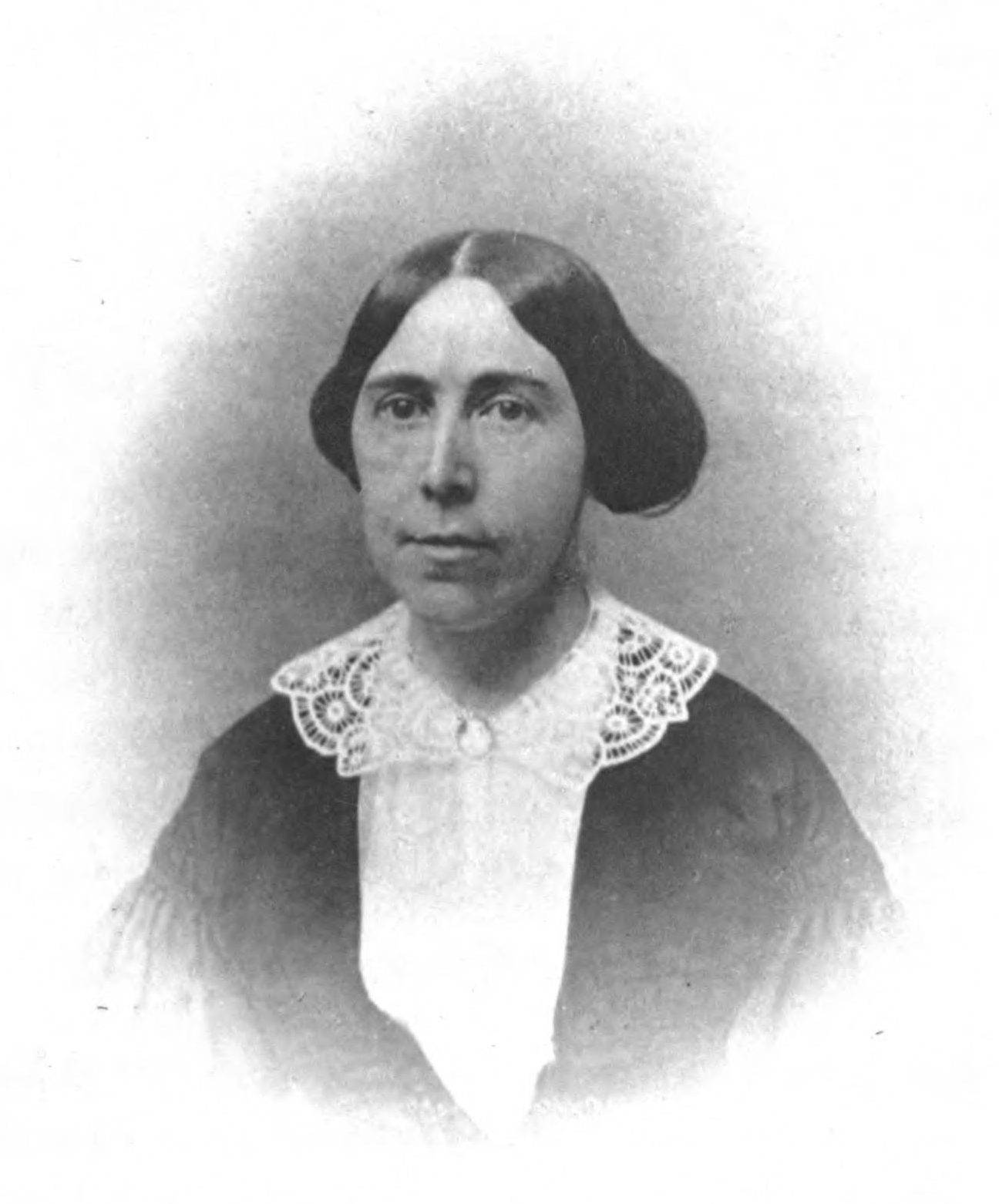
- Born: Sophia Elizabeth Thoreau; June 24, 1819; Chelmsford, Massachusetts, U.S.
- Died: October 7, 1876 (aged 57); Bangor, Maine
- Occupation: Editor

Sophia Elizabeth Thoreau (June 24, 1819 – October 7, 1876) was an American editor. As the sister of Henry David Thoreau and his close collaborator, she was responsible for the posthumous publication of many of his well-known works.

== Life ==
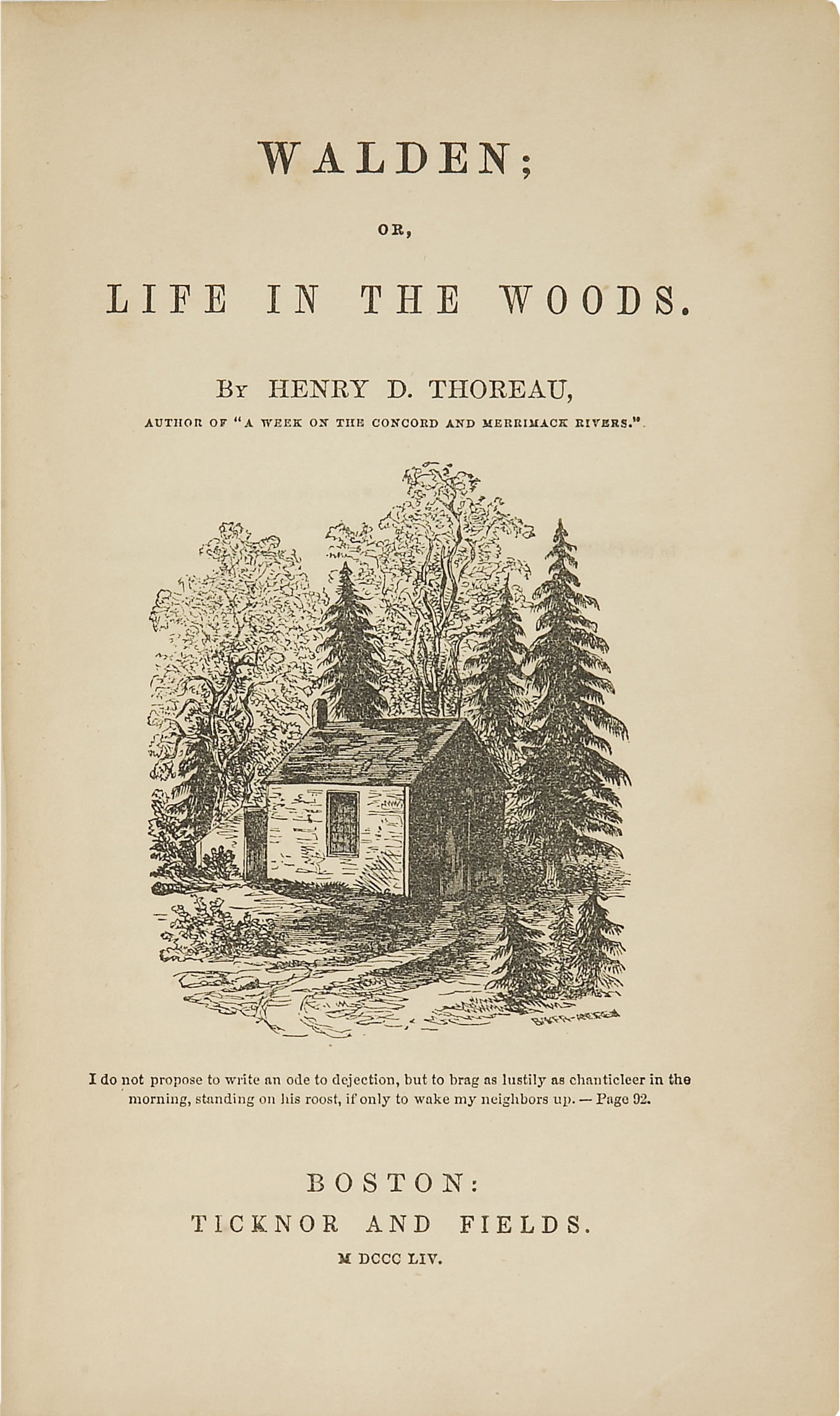
The original title page of Walden was drawn by Sophia Thoreau.

Sophia Thoreau was born in Chelmsford, Massachusetts, on June 24, 1819, the youngest of four children in the Thoreau family. Sophia attended Phoebe Wheeler's dame school and Concord Academy, where she studied Latin. She was an active supporter of abolitionism and various other causes. Sophia was also known as an artist, gardener, naturalist, and teacher. Following the death of her father, John Thoreau, she handled his business interests. After Henry David Thoreau died in 1862, Sophia Thoreau served as the primary editor of his posthumously published works, Excursions (1863), The Maine Woods (1864), Cape Cod (1865), and A Yankee in Canada (1866). She also chose the editor for the publication of Thoreau's journal. Sophia Thoreau's influence on the posthumous publication of Henry David Thoreau's work was often overlooked and attributed instead to Ralph Waldo Emerson and William Ellery Channing. Sophia Thoreau died in Bangor, Maine, on October 7, 1876.

A daguerreotype of Sophia Thoreau dating to 1855 has been held by the Concord Museum since 2017.
