= Arnoldia (journal) =

- Discipline: Plant science
- Language: English

Publication details
- Former name: Bulletin of Popular Information
- History: 1911–present
- Publisher: Arnold Arboretum (United States)
- Frequency: Quarterly

Standard abbreviations
- ISO 4: Arnoldia

Indexing
- ISSN: 0004-2633
- LCCN: 44039415
- JSTOR: 00042633

Links
- Journal homepage

Arnoldia is a quarterly magazine published by the Arnold Arboretum of Harvard University. It is an interdisciplinary publication with articles covering a broad range of topics including plant exploration, plant taxonomy and biogeography, landscape design, and more. While the authors are primarily researchers and other plant professionals, all are encouraged to write with a narrative and explanatory style that is accessible to a wide range of readers.

== History ==
Arnoldia was established as the Bulletin of Popular Information in 1911. The Arnold Arboretum's first director, Charles Sprague Sargent, viewed the publication as a means of alerting visitors to the "flowering of important plants" in the Arnold Arboretum's collections. Initially, the Bulletins were issued only during the growing season, and with a Bulletin in hand, there was no reason a visitor should miss the flowering or fruiting of any plant on the grounds.

After Sargent's death in March 1927, Ernest Henry Wilson assumed responsibility of the publication. Other than the addition of illustrations, however, the publication continued to be a seasonal guide filled with information on the phenology, history, and culture of the Arboretum's plants. It was not until Wilson's untimely death in 1930 that the content began to expand. Edgar Anderson, best known for his later work at the Missouri Botanical Garden, edited the publication for the next four years, and while "plants of current interest" remained a regular feature, staff members began to contribute longer articles, with new interdisciplinary topics including ethnobotanical uses of plants, botanical art, and landscape history. This thematic expansion was encouraged by Oakes Ames, a Harvard professor of botany who had been appointed the managing supervisor of the Arnold Arboretum in 1927. In 1931, Ames wrote the first Bulletin article about botanical art.

Donald Wyman took over the editorship in 1936, and in 1941 Arnold Arboretum director Elmer Drew Merrill, who was partial to one-word titles, changed the Bulletin of Popular Information into Arnoldia, honoring benefactor James Arnold. Wyman wrote the lion's share of its articles for over thirty years. A remembrance in 1993 recognized his contributions: "More, perhaps, than any other single person, certainly of his era, he advanced the knowledge of hardy woody plants through his articles published in Arnoldia and elsewhere . . . His work may now seem familiar, but only because it's been so often imitated."

After Wyman's retirement, other editors expanded the content. In 1970, Arnoldia was reformatted as magazine with multiple contributors per issue, and the inaugural issue contained articles about botanical libraries, a botanical trip to Hong Kong, and the natural history of a common weed. The scope of the publication has continued to expand over the subsequent decades, attracting an even wider variety of scholarship.

== Aims and scope ==
Arnoldia calls its interdisciplinary approach “plant studies,” as opposed to “plant science,” which implies that authors should use a humanities-based approach, even when the subject matter comes from a scientific research background.
