= Larz Anderson Bonsai Collection =

Coordinates: 42°18′12.1″N 71°7′26.6″W

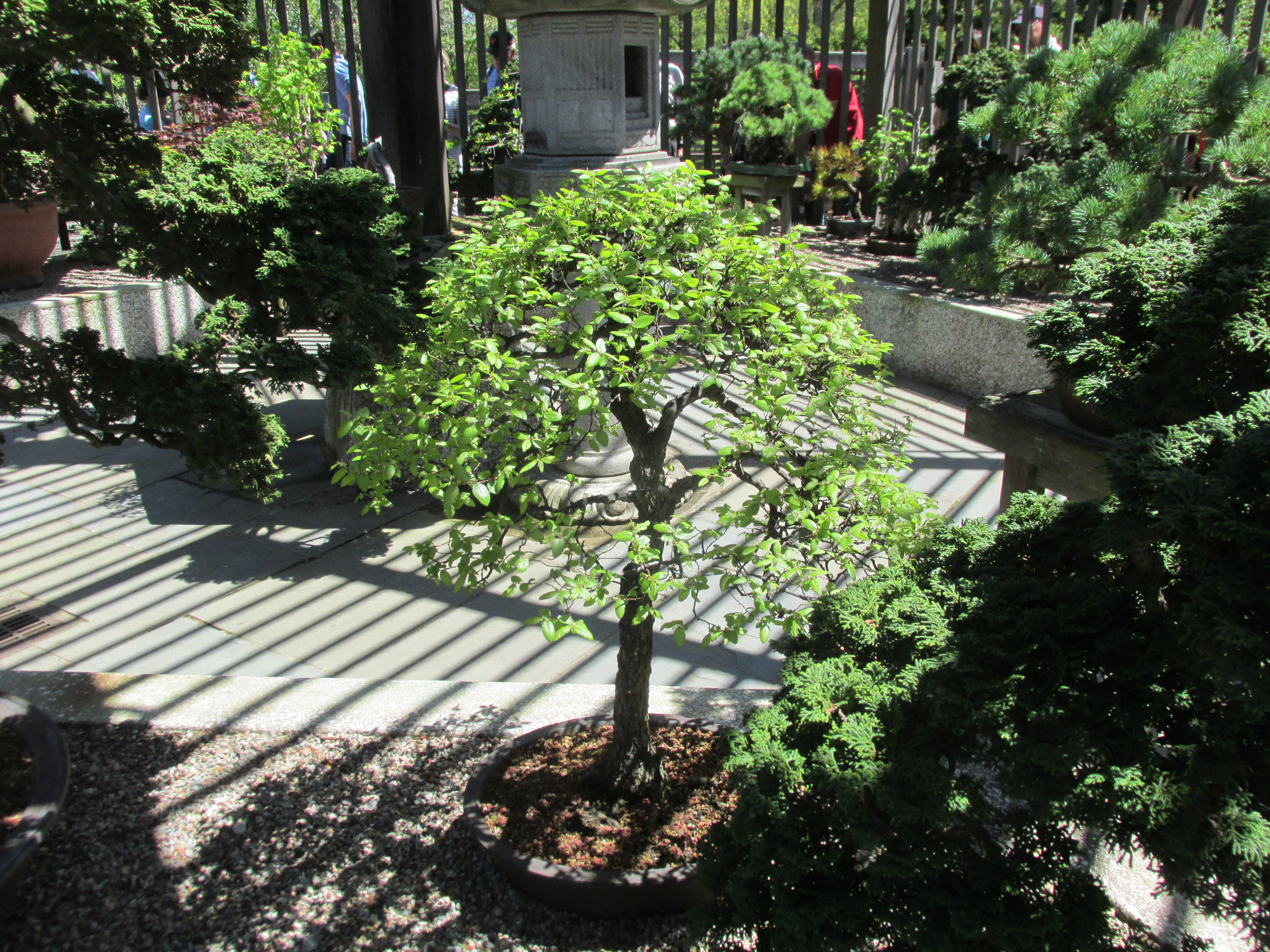
Cedar Elm

The Larz Anderson Bonsai Collection at the Arnold Arboretum in Jamaica Plain, Massachusetts is one of the premier collections of bonsai in the United States and includes a Hinoki Cypress over 250 years old.

The Bonsai Pavilion where the trees are housed are part of the complex of buildings known as the Dana Greenhouses. The collection is on display from mid-April to the end of October. As the bonsai trees are deciduous, they are held in cold storage at temperatures slightly above freezing throughout the winter.

== Larz and Isabel ==
Larz Anderson had a long interest in the horticulture of Japan. He brought two dwarf maples back from his first trip to Japan in 1889. In 1907, he and his wife Isabel Weld Perkins built a Japanese garden at Weld (now Larz Anderson Park). But it was in 1913, while Larz Anderson was in Japan as U.S. Ambassador, that the Andersons became truly enraptured with bonsai. He wrote:

About us were dwarf trees of fantastic shape and stunted plum in fragrant bloom, white and pink, and gnarled trees hundreds of years old with branches blossoming out of seemingly dead trunks in pots of beautiful form and color. Isabel and I stopped so long in this little fairy place that we had to drive like the dickens through the congested streets of endless villages to Yokohama ... in time for one o'clock luncheon.

== Yokohama Nursery ==
The Andersons purchased 40 bonsai from the Yokohama Nursery Company. The company's catalogs from 1901 to 1922 are impressive documents, beautifully illustrated with colored plates, line drawings, and photographs. In a section titled "Dwarf Trees Growing in Jardinieres" the catalogs show pictures of ancient specimens of Hinoki Cypress similar to those that are now part of the collection. They are captioned "Relics of the Tokugawa Era".

The price Anderson paid for his plants is unknown, but the 1913-1914 edition of the catalog lists prices ranging from one to fifty dollars "in U.S. gold". When the Andersons returned to the US about a month later, they brought these bonsai with them and housed them at Weld.

== Rainosuke Awano ==
At that time, knowledge of how to care for bonsai did not exist among Americans. Instead, the Andersons hired a succession of skilled Japanese gardeners. The most famous of these was Rainosuke Awano, a young man who maintained the collection while studying for his doctorate in philosophy at Columbia University. He later returned to Japan and became a professor at Kwansei Gakuin University.

== Public display ==
On at least two occasions the Andersons displayed their bonsai collection to the public. They first displayed their new collection at the 1916 spring flower show of the Massachusetts Horticultural Society. When that same organization sponsored a show of chrysanthemums and Japanese dwarf trees in 1933, the Andersons participated again. On this occasion, House Beautiful magazine interviewed Rainosuke Awano and showed photographs of the collection. The author described the bonsai with heavy metaphor:

It seems unholy to move such venerable patriarchs from the land where they have lived so long in meditation and repose. But they are here, nevertheless, in this country which was a wilderness when they and their art had reached a high degree of elegance and culture. And on the wide green terrace before the stately Brookline home of Mr. Larz Anderson, noted statesman and scholar, these noble trees, samurai of their realm, seem quite at home. That may be because adaptability is a quality of the nobly born.

== The donation ==
After Larz died in 1937, Isabel donated thirty of these miniature trees to the Arnold Arboretum of Harvard University along with the funds necessary to build a shade house for their display. When she died in 1948, the remaining nine plants in her possession were donated to the Arboretum including an 80-year-old Hinoki Cypress that had been given to the Andersons by the Imperial Household shortly before they left Japan for the last time.

== Decline ==
Arboretum staff did their best given their limited knowledge of the art of bonsai, but the Larz Anderson Collection suffered from the lack of expert skills needed to keep the fragile trees healthy. The practice of annually forcing them into early growth for the spring flower show of the Massachusetts Horticultural Society contributed the collection's decline. By 1962, 27 of the original 39 bonsai survived. Among those that perished was the Hinoki Cypress that had been Hirohito's gift to the Andersons.

== Dana Greenhouses ==
The 1962 construction of the Charles Stratton Dana Greenhouses was of benefit to the collection. This facility includes a hexagonal, redwood lath house to display the collection during the growing season and a concrete-block cold storage for winter protection. The latter maintains temperatures between 33 and 35 degrees Fahrenheit. Formerly, the bonsai had been placed in covered pits and cold frames for the winter. This practice compromised the health of the plants and the consequent freezing of the rootballs cracked many of the original Japanese containers.

== New expertise ==
In 1969 the bonsai again came under the care of a true expert. Constance "Connie" Derderian had been teaching courses in bonsai at the Arboretum for several years prior to her appointment. She describes:

Perhaps because I was the only Bostonian who, for almost ten years, had steadily pursued the study of bonsai in the United States and in Japan, in 1969, through the efforts of Mr. Alfred Fordham, Dr. Donald Wyman asked me to repot the Anderson collection of bonsai. I did and began a program to renew the vigor and beauty of these venerable trees. Dr. Richard A. Howard, director, pleased with the initial effort, had me appointed Honorary Curator of the Bonsai Collection.

Under Derderian's care, the remaining portion of the collection was revitalized. When she resigned in 1984, Peter Del Tredici having worked as her apprentice since 1979, became the new curator. In recent years Colin Lewis, a noted bonsai artist and author, has been working on the collection. The health and aesthetic value of the collection is improving under his care.

== Theft ==
The bonsai house was broken into over Columbus Day weekend 1986. Six plants were stolen, including three Japanese Maples that were part of the original Larz Anderson Collection. Prompted by this disaster, the Arnold Arboretum renovated the bonsai house. Deteriorating redwood planks were replaced with sturdy douglas fir. New doors allowed visitors an unobstructed view of the collection and a new security system was installed.

== Extant specimens ==
15 plants remain of the original 39 which the Andersons donated:

- 7 Hinoki Cypress (Chamaecyparis obtusa)
- 4 Japanese Maple (Acer palmatum)
- 1 Trident Maple (Acer buergerianum)
- 1 Higan Cherry (Prunus subhirtella)
- 1 Sawara Cypress (Chamaecyparis pisifera 'Squarrosa')
- 1 Japanese White Pine (Pinus parviflora)

The Hinoki Cypress seem to be especially hardy; 7 of the 10 original plants are still alive. According to Anderson's records, the oldest of these Hinoki Cypress was started in 1737.

== See also ==
- Larz Anderson Park
