= Joseph Hers =

Belgian railroad engineer and botanist

Joseph Hers (1884–1965) was a Belgian railroad engineer who served from 1919 to 1924 as a botanist in northern China, where he discovered several new varieties of lilac. Some have been named after him.

== Career ==
He was born in Namur, Belgium on September 6, 1884 and started working in China in 1905 as an interpreter for the Belgian Ministry of Foreign Affairs. He was then the Secretary General of Lunghai and Pienlo railways and he was also an assessor at the International Mixed Court in Shanghai.

Hers based himself at Zhengzhou (Chengchow), the capital city of Henan. He was far from being a desk-bound bureaucrat and clearly relished the outdoor aspect of his position, exploring and surveying the route of the railway line. He was a tall, strong-looking man, as can be seen from several extant photographs, and travelled tirelessly in difficult conditions. His role in the construction of the rail line certainly would have brought him into a work-related contact with William Purdom, as the Englishman was involved in re-afforestation activities in this area, as part of his work at the Xinyang forestry section.

Although Ernest Wilson is usually given the credit, it is possible that it was in fact William Purdom who initially encouraged the Belgian railway-man to contact Charles Sargent and offer his services as an amateur plant collector suggesting that he could provide plant material from areas little visited previously by Europeans. Although he was not a trained botanist, Joseph Hers carried out this task with great enthusiasm from 1919 until 1926 gathering seeds, perhaps of as many as 400 lots, and herbarium specimens to send to the Arnold Arboretum in the USA. Sargent, as was his usual procedure, shared many of these collections with Sir David Prain at Kew Gardens.

== Discoveries ==
From 1919–1938, he collected more than 2000 species of trees and shrubs and published papers about indigenous woody plants of Northeastern Asia.

JosephHers principally collected for Charles Sargent the Director of the Arnold Arboretum in Boston. However, he also sent material to the Musée d’Histoire naturelle de Paris and the National Botanic Garden of Belgium including rarities such as Corylus mandshurica var. sieboldiana and Acer tataricum var. ginnala. He was also a very competent and prolific photographer and was able to illustrate many of the botanical articles that he published in the Bulletin de la Société dendrologique de France.

== Death ==
Hers died in 1965.

Articles written by Joseph Hers.

Hers, J. (1922). Le culte des arbres en Chine. Bulletin de la Société dendrologique de France. Paris. 45. pp. 104–109.

Hers, J. (1923a). Notes sur les saules et peupliers de la Chine du Nord. Bulletin de la Société dendrologique de France. 49: pp. 152– 159.

Hers, J. (1923b). Coniferes. Bulletin de la Société dendrologique de France. 49:p. 170.
