= William Melvin Kelley =

American novelist (1937–2017)

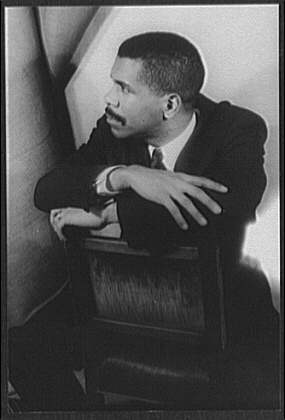
- Kelley (1963)
- Born: November 1, 1937; Staten Island, New York, U.S.
- Died: February 1, 2017 (aged 79); Manhattan, New York, U.S.
- Education: Harvard University
- Occupations: Writer, educator
- Spouse: Karen (Aiki) Kelley
- Children: Jessica (daughter), Cira (daughter)
- Writing career
- Genres: Novel, short story
- Notable works: A Different Drummer (1962), dem (1967)
- Notable awards: Anisfield-Wolf Book Award

William Melvin Kelley (November 1, 1937 – February 1, 2017) was an African-American novelist and short-story writer. He is perhaps best known for his debut novel, A Different Drummer, published in 1962. He was also a university professor and creative writing instructor. In 2008, he received the Anisfield-Wolf Book Award for Lifetime Achievement. Kelley is credited with being the first to commit the term "woke" to print, in the title of a 1962 New York Times op-ed on the use of African-American slang by beatniks: "If You're Woke, You Dig It".

== Career ==
While a student at Harvard, Kelley was awarded the Dana Reed Prize for creative writing, for a short story entitled "The Poker Party." His debut novel, A Different Drummer, was published in 1962, when Kelley was 24 years old. Told entirely through the perspectives of white characters, it describes a black exodus from an unnamed Southern state. Its success seemed to bode well for a bright authorial future, and in 1964 Kelley's short-story collection, Dancers on the Shore, was published, followed in 1965 by his second novel, A Drop of Patience.

In early 1966, Kelley got his agent to secure him an assignment from the Saturday Evening Post to cover the trial of the men accused of the assassination of Malcolm X. Kelley became convinced that two of the accused, Norman Butler and Thomas Johnson, were being railroaded, which led him to lose his belief of the independence of the judiciary, and to "depart the plantation" and move abroad.

In 1967, as he published his third novel, dem, Kelley moved to Paris, France, and lectured in American literature at the University of Paris. Kelley was also a teacher and writing instructor. His academic appointments included a stint as writer-in-residence at the State University of New York at Geneseo; he also taught at the New School for Social Research and at Sarah Lawrence College from 1989 until his death in 2017.

In 1988, Kelley starred in Excavating Harlem in 2290, which he also wrote and produced, collaborating with Steve Bull to bring it to the screen. He also contributed to The Beauty That I Saw, a film assembled from Kelley's video diaries of Harlem. Edited by Benjamin Oren Abrams, it was featured at the Harlem International Film Festival in 2015.

Even though Kelley published only four novels and a volume of short stories, all featuring recurrent characters, as well as some essays and articles, he never stopped writing. In a 2012 interview, he mentioned having completed two more novels that have thus far remained unpublished. Daddy Peaceful is loosely autobiographical, while Dis/integration is a meta-fiction taking up from his last published book, dunfords travels everywheres (1970), and containing another novel-within called Death Fall, about a small Kansas town facing a drug epidemic, that features no black characters.

=== Influence and legacy ===
According to Robert E. Fleming:

From the beginning of his career in 1962, William Melvin Kelley has employed his distinctive form of Black comedy to examine the absurdities surrounding American racial attitudes.

Kelley is credited with being the first to commit the term "woke" to print, in the title of a 1962 op-ed for The New York Timeson the use of African-American slang by beatniks: "If You're Woke, You Dig It".

For Kathryn Schulz, writing in The New Yorker in 2018, Kelley is "the lost giant of American literature".

== Personal life ==
William Melvin Kelley was born on November 1, 1937, at Seaview Hospital, a tuberculosis sanatorium on Staten Island in New York City, where his mother, Narcissa Agatha Garcia Kelley, was a patient. His father William was for many years the editor of the Amsterdam News and his family was involved in the Methodist Episcopal church. Kelley grew up in the working-class Italian-American neighbourhood of The Bronx, with his parents and his maternal grandmother, a seamstress, who was the daughter of an enslaved African and a Confederate colonel.

He was educated at the nearly all-white Fieldston School in New York, where he became student-council president and captain of the track team. He then went to Harvard University (class of 1960), where he studied under John Hawkes and Archibald MacLeish. Kelley's mother died during his sophomore year and his father when he was a senior. Kelley unsuccessfully switched majors four times and dropped out in 1960, six months before graduation, to become a writer.

On December 15, 1962, only 8 months after they met again at the Penn Relays, Kelley married Karen Gibson, a young woman from Chicago who was studying art at Sarah Lawrence College to become a painter (she was later to be known by the first name Aiki). They had first met briefly as teenagers. They moved to Rome in 1963, and returned to the United States after a year.

Their first daughter, Jessica, was born in February 1965, and their second daughter, Cira, in May 1968 in Paris, where the Kelleys lived at 4 Rue Regis, the building where author Richard Wright had lived a few years earlier.

After the 1968 assassinations of Martin Luther King Jr. and Robert F. Kennedy, Kelley and his wife decided they did not want to raise their family amidst the US's racial violence. Originally, the family had plans to move on from Paris to Francophone Africa, but relocated to Jamaica instead, where they lived for nearly a decade. Having rediscovered the Bible, Kelley and his family embraced Judaism. In 1977, nearly penniless, they moved back to New York to a derelict six-floor walkup at 125th Street and Fifth Avenue, and later to the Dunbar Apartments in Harlem.

== Death ==
Kelley died in Manhattan on February 1, 2017, due to complications from kidney failure. He was 79.

== Bibliography ==
- A Different Drummer, Doubleday (1962), reprinted by Anchor Books (1990, ISBN 0-385-41390-4), and by riverrun (2018, ISBN 1787478033)
- Dancers on the Shore, Doubleday (1964), reprinted by Howard University Press (1982, ISBN 0-8825-8114-7), and by riverrun (2020, ISBN 178747805X)
- A Drop of Patience, Doubleday (1965), reprinted by Ecco Press (1996, ISBN 0-8800-1460-1), and by riverrun (2019, ISBN 1787478076)
- dem, Doubleday (1967), reprinted by Coffee House Press (2001, ISBN 1-56689-102-7), and by Anchor Books (2020, ISBN 1984899333)
- dunfords travels everywheres, Doubleday (1970, ISBN 0-8936-6101-5), and by Anchor Books (2020, ISBN 1984899376)
