= Anna Sher =

American plant ecologist

Anna Amelia Sher
- Education: University of New Mexico Ph.D; Earlham College B.S.
- Scientific career
- Workplaces: University of Denver
- Thesis: Seedling ecology of competing riparian trees : native cottonwood (Populus deltoides subsp wislizenii) and invasive salt cedar (Tamarix ramosissima). (1998)

Anna Amelia Sher is an American plant ecologist who is a professor at the University of Denver. She works on conservation and the restoration of areas invaded by Tamarix. She is the author of two textbooks, Ecology:Concepts and Applications and Introduction to conservation biology.

== Early life and education ==
Sher was an undergraduate student at Earlham College, where she majored in biology and art, and was first introduced to invasive plants, which she attributes to biology professor Brent Smith. She moved to the University of New Mexico for graduate studies, where she worked under the supervision of Diane Marshall. Her doctoral research considered the ecology of competing riparian trees: cottonwood and invasive salt cedar (Tamarix). She completed field work at the Bosque del Apache National Wildlife Refuge in New Mexico. After earning her doctorate, Sher travelled to Ben-Gurion University of the Negev, where she was supported by a Fulbright Program scholarship. On her return to the United States, Sher joined the University of California, Davis as a postdoctoral researcher investigating invasive grasses.

== Research and career ==
In 2003, Sher moved to Denver where she was appointed Assistant Professor at the University of Denver and Director of Research at the Denver Botanic Gardens. She was promoted to tenured associate professor in 2008 and full professor in 2017.

Sher's research considers preservation and the environmental protection and conservation, the ecology of invasive plants and ways to restore damaged ecosystems. She has extensively investigated the Tamarix, an invasive, exotic tree species of West America.

Sher was the second female full professor in the history of her department, and the third in the division of Natural Sciences and Mathematics at DU. She was the first mother to both achieve tenure and be promoted to full in her division. She would go on to found the STEM Women Faculty Association and lead a cross-campus team to address inequalities for faculty in the sciences.

== Awards and honors ==
- 2020 University of Denver Distinguished Scholar Award
- 2020 Robin Morgan Outstanding Woman Award

== Selected publications ==
=== Books ===
- A. A. Sher. 2022. An Introduction to Conservation Biology, third edition. Oxford University Press.
- A.A. Sher and M. Molles. 2021. Ecology Concepts and Applications, ninth edition. McGraw Hill Education.
- Sher, A.A. and Primack, R. 2019. An Introduction to Conservation Biology, second edition. Oxford University Press.
- Molles, Manuel C. Jr.; Sher, Anna A. (2019). Ecology: concepts and applications. Anna Sher (8 ed.). New York, NY: McGraw Hill Education. ISBN 978-1-259-88005-6. OCLC 1010579815.
- Primack, Richard B.; Sher, Anna A. (2016). Introduction to conservation biology. Anna Sher. Sunderland, MA, U.S.A.: Sinauer Associates. ISBN 978-1-60535-473-6. OCLC 938396290.
- Sher, A. and M. Quigley. 2013. Tamarix: A case study of ecological change in the American West. Oxford University Press. 512 pages.

=== Journal articles ===
Dr. Sher has published dozens of scientific papers in peer-reviewed journals; this work has been cited thousands of times. A current list of publications and citations can be found on her Google Scholar page. Her ORCID ID is https://orcid.org/0000-0002-6433-9746. The following are a sample of some of her better known works (* indicates student co-authors. Note that first and last positions in author lists typically indicate person who did most of the writing and the one who is the senior/supervising PI, respectively):

- Sher, A. A., Clark, L.*, Henry, A. L.,* Goetz, A. R.*, González, E*., Tyagi, A*., I. Simpson* & Bourgeois, B. (2020). The human element of restoration success: manager characteristics affect vegetation recovery following invasive Tamarix control. Wetlands, 1-19.
- Peter Chesson; Renate L E Gebauer; Susan Schwinning; et al. (7 April 2004). "Resource pulses, species interactions, and diversity maintenance in arid and semi-arid environments". Oecologia. 141 (2): 236–253. Bibcode:2004Oecol.141..236C. doi:10.1007/s00442-004-1551-1. ISSN 0029-8549. PMID 15069635. Wikidata Q30919765.
- Anna A. Sher; Diane L. Marshall; Steven A. Gilbert (18 December 2000). "Competition between Native Populus deltoides and Invasive Tamarix ramosissima and the Implications for Reestablishing Flooding Disturbance". Conservation Biology. 14 (6): 1744–1754. doi:10.1111/j.1523-1739.2000.99306.x. ISSN 0888-8892. PMID 35701936. Wikidata Q55842471.
- Murphy, S. M., Vyas, D. K., Sher, A. A., & Grenis, K.* (2022). Light pollution affects invasive and native plant traits important to plant competition and herbivorous insects. Biological Invasions, 24(3), 599-602.
- Primack, R. B., Sher, A. A., Maas, B., & Adams, V. M. (2021). Manager characteristics drive conservation success. Biological Conservation, 259, 109169
- Henry, A. L.*, González, E., Bourgeois, B., & Sher, A. A. (2021). Invasive tree cover covaries with environmental factors to explain the functional composition of riparian plant communities. Oecologia, 1-14.
- Christie, A. P., Abecasis, D., Adjeroud, M., Alonso, J. C., Amano, T., Anton, A., ... & Sher, A (2020). Quantifying and addressing the prevalence and bias of study designs in the environmental and social sciences. Nature Communications, 11(1), 1-11.\
- Clark, L.*, A. Henry*, E. González, R. Lave, N. Sayre, A.A. Sher. 2019. Information exchange between restoration scientists and managers benefits from a two- way street: a case study in the American Southwest. Restoration Ecology 27 12:41.
- Henry, A., E. González E, W.W. Robinson, B. Bourgeois, A.A. Sher. 2018. Spatial modeling improves understanding patternsof invasive species defoliation by a biocontrol herbivore. Biological Invasions. https://doi.org/10.1007/s10530-018-1794-0
- González E., V. Martínez-Fernández, P.B. Shafroth, A.A. Sher, A.L. Henry, V. Garófano-Gómez, Dov Corenblit. 2018. Regeneration of Salicaceae Riparian Forests in the Northern Hemisphere: A New Framework and Management Tool. Journal of Environmental Management 218:374-387.
- Sher, A.A., H. El Waer*, E. González*, R. Anderson*, A.L. Henry*, R Biedron*, P. Yue*. 2018. Native species recovery after reduction of an invasive tree by biological control with and without active removal. Ecological Engineering 111:167-175
- Gonzalez E.*, A.A. Sher, and 17 others. 2017. Secondary invasions of noxious weeds promoted by management-related disturbance. Biological Conservation 213:106-114.
- Gonzalez E.*, A.A. Sher, and 17 others. 2017. Vegetation Response to Control of Invasive Tamarix in Southwestern US Rivers: A Collaborative Study Including 416 Sites. Ecological Applications. doi:10.1002/eap.1566
- Statwick, J*, A.K. Williams*, and A.A. Sher. 2017. Evidence against the drought tolerance hypothesis of hyperaccumulation in Astragalus species. International Journal of Plant Sciences 178(6).
- Statwick, J.*, and Sher, A. A. 2017. Selenium in soils of western Colorado. Journal of Arid Environments, 137: 1-6.
- González, E.*, Felipe-Lucia, M. R., Bourgeois, B., Boz, B., Nilsson, C., Palmer, G., and Sher, A. A. 2017. Integrative conservation of riparian zones. Biological Conservation 211:20-29
- Statwick, J*, B. Magestic, and A.A. Sher. 2016. Characterization and benefits of selenium uptake by an Astragalus hyperaccumulator and a non-accumulator. Plant and Soil, 1-15.
- Statwick, J*, and A.A. Sher. 2016. Selenium in soils of western Colorado. Journal of Arid Environments 137:1-6.
- Munson, S. and A.A. Sher. 2015. Long-term shifts in the phenology of rare and endemic rocky mountain plants. American Journal of Botany 102 (8), 1268-1276. doi:10.3732/ajb.1500156
- Gonzalez E.*, A.A. Sher, E. Tabacchi, A. Masip, M. Poulin. 2015. Restoration of riparian vegetation: A global review of implementation and evaluation approaches in the international, peer-reviewed literature. Journal of Environmental Management 158:85-94.
- Gonzalez, E.*, B. Berenger, A. Masip, A.A. Sher. 2015. Trade-Offs in Seed Dispersal Strategies Across Riparian Trees: The How Matters as Much as the When. River Research and Applications. doi:10.1002/rra.2899
- Sproull, G.*, M.F. Quigley, A.A. Sher, E. Gonzalez. 2015. Long-term changes in composition, diversity, and distribution patterns in four herbaceous plant communities along an elevational gradient. Journal of Vegetation Science. doi:10.1111/jvs.12264
- Sher, A.A. 2014. Invasive plant ecology: an international treatment of a growing field of study. Ecology 95: 581-582.
- Gaddis, M*, and A. Sher. 2013. Russian Olive (Elaeagnus angustifolia) Removal in the Western United States: Multi-Site Findings and Considerations for Future Research. Sustainability 4, 3346-3361; doi:10.3390/su4123346
- Ohrtman, M.*, K. Lair, and A.A. Sher. 2012. Quantifying soil salinity in areas invaded by Tamarix spp. Journal of Arid Environments 85:114-121.
- Nissen, S., A. Norton, and A. Sher. 2011. Tamarisk impacts on Colorado watersheds. Colorado Water. Vol 28, no. 4. pg. 2-3.
- Sher, A.A., K. Wiegand, D. Ward. 2010. Do Acacia and Tamarix trees compete for water in the Negev desert? Journal of Arid Environments 74:338-343.
- Sher, A.A., S. Gieck*, C. Brown, and S. Nissen. 2008. First-year responses of cheatgrass following tamarisk control and restoration-related disturbances. Restoration Ecology 16:129-135.
- Bay, R.F.* and A.A. Sher. 2008. Success of Active Revegetation after Tamarix spp. Removal in Riparian Ecosystems of the Southwestern USA: A Quantitative Assessment of Past Restoration Projects. Restoration Ecology 16 113-128.
- Shafroth, P. B., V. B. Beauchamp, M. K. Briggs, K. Lair, M. L. Scott, and A. A. Sher. 2008. Planning riparian restoration in the context of Tamarix control in western North America. Restoration Ecology 16 97-112.
- Smith, S.*, A.A. Sher and T.A. Grant. 2007. Genetic Diversity in Restoration Materials and the Impacts of Seed Collection in Colorado's Restoration Plant Production Industry. Restoration Ecology 15:369-374.
- Sher, A. A., D.E. Goldberg, A. Novoplansky. 2004. The effect of mean and variance in resource supply on survival of annuals from Mediterranean and desert environments. Oecologia 141 (2): 353-362.
- Sher, A.A. and D. L. Marshall. 2003. Competition between native and exotic floodplain tree species across water regimes and soil textures. American Journal of Botany 90: 413-422.
- Sher, A.A., D.L. Marshall, and J. Taylor. 2002. Spatial partitioning within southwestern floodplains: patterns of establishment of native Populus and Salix in the presence of invasive, non-native Tamarix. Ecological Applications 12:760-772.
- Sher, A.A. and L.H. Hyatt. 1999. The Disturbance-Invasion Matrix: a new framework for predicting plant invasions. Biological Invasions 1(3-4):109-114.

== Personal life ==
Sher is a member of 500 Queer Scientists. She was the first member of her department to be out. Sher and her wife, Fran, were the first couple in Denver to receive a civil union. Together they have one son.
