= William Purdom =

British plant explorer

William Purdom (10 April 1880 – 7 November 1921) was an English plant explorer. After being apprenticed as a gardener at Brathay Hall in the English Lake district, he traveled to London to work at the Hugh Low, Enfield Nursery, then onto the Veitch establishment at Coombe Wood. In 1902, Purdom took up a position as a gardener at Kew Botanic Garden soon becoming promoted to a sub-foreman (leading-hand) position. Purdom became heavily involved with early Union activities particularly promoting the rights of junior workers which eventually led to his unjustified dismissal. Despite being a bane to the, then, Kew Director, David Prain, the latter recognized the talents of William Purdom and recommended his employee as being very suitable as a plant collector for a joint venture by Veitch and the Arnold Arboretum of Harvard University to the northern provinces of China in 1909.

Purdom collected and photographed plants for the Arboretum, as well as the great British Nursery firm for three years 1909- 1911. Over many months in the field, he traveled and collected from as far north as Duolun Nor and Rehe, to Wutaishan, out to Yulin and Yan'an on the fringes of the Ordos Desert, to the peaks of Tabaishan, as well as in the Minshan Mountains and Lamashan near Jone. He failed in an attempt to reach the monastery of Labrang and the Amnye Machen range due to the hostility of the local lamas. In this period of severe turmoil in China, Purdom's life was at risk on several occasions

In 1914, Purdom and the well-known English horticulturalist, Reginald Farrer, set out on an ambitious expedition to Qinghai then Tibetan Amdo and the Gansu province of North-west China. Extensive plant collections were made by the pair through the Minshan Ranges and 'Stony Mountains' in their first season, followed by explorations in the Datong Mountains just to the north-west of Xining. Purdom himself traveled as far west as Lake Qinghai (KokoNor) in search of new plants. Their base camps included Zhugqu (Siku), Jone, as well as the Buddhist monasteries of Quezang (Chebson Abbey) and Tiantang. After completing the work in Gansu, Purdom and Farrer returned overland, traveling by horseback and river-boat southwards through the Dabashan Range and into the Sichuan basin before returning to the coast by way of the Yangtze River steamboat service. The expedition was a great success despite the very definite threats to their lives both from superstitious Tibetan locals and the 'White Wolves' rebels.

These two years of exploring and plant collecting are described in Farrer's On the Eaves of the World (2 vols) (1917), and Farrer's posthumous The Rainbow Bridge (1921). In those volumes, Farrer very much indicates that the expedition could not have succeeded without the drive, the organisational talents and experience of his co-worker William Purdom.

Following the expedition, Purdom chose to remain in China and in 1916 was appointed an Inspector of Forests to the Chinese Government in Beijing, particularly concerning himself with re-afforestation projects. When that department was dissolved in 1918, he transferred to the section of government planning the development of the rapidly expanding railway system. In the later capacity he was based in the city of Xinyang on the Beijing to Hankou rail-line working under the eminent Chinese forester, Han An. Here, a hundred years later, Purdom has been afforded a unique Chinese honour, with the Purdom Forest Park, containing some of his original plantings, named in his recognition. At this point he came into professional contact with the Belgian railway engineer and botanical collector, Joseph Hers, who was himself working on the new railway heading towards Xi'an. Hers acknowledged their friendship and collaboration in an article that he wrote in 1923.

The pair with similar interests and a love for China, planned to edit Flora of China, but the plan was abandoned probably owing to the premature death of Purdom in Beijing 1921 from complications following a minor operation on an infected gland in his neck. Hers went on to acknowledge Purdom, both as a friend and botanical collaborator in his later writings in the Bulletin de la Société Dendrologique de France..

Purdom collected very many plants new to science and horticulture. Although many of the epithets originally given in his honour have been superseded, quite a number across a wide spectrum of genera still remain in use. These names were given by botanists at both the Arnold Arboretum using the specimens that he had sent there, and those at Kew (whence he had been earlier dismissed) when studying flowering specimens of new plants sent there by the Veitch Nursery.

Purdom's eponymous species include:

Rhododendron purdomii, Populus purdomii, Ligularia purdomii, Dryopteris purdomii, Gentiana purdomii, Primula purdomii, Caragana purdomii, Berberis purdomii, Leptodermis purdomii, Astragalus purdomii, Dracocephalum purdomii.

Botanical records now reveal that it was Purdom who first discovered the peony species, P. fruticosa and P. rockii; the latter find made more than a decade before the collections made by the explorer Joseph Rock.

Published articles by William Purdom

Purdom, W. (1913a). Plant-collecting in China by Mr Purdom. Gardeners’ Chronicle. pp. 229– 231.

Purdom, W. (1913b). Aesculus chinensis in China. Gardeners’ Chronicle. pp .346-347.

Purdom's Legacy.

Purdom collected several hundred herbarium specimens under his own name, most of which are represented at the Arnold Arboretum and Kew Garden's herbariums. He became an accomplished photographer and a large collection of his images are held at the Arnold Arboretum and can be viewed on line. Farrer himself indicated that many of the photographs which he used in his lectures and in his 'China' books were in fact taken by Purdom. Many of the latter, and also extremely interesting photographs that Purdom took whilst in China in 1916-1920 are held at the RBG Edinburgh on behalf of the Lakeland Horticultural Society.
