= Richard Primack =

American biologist (born 1950)

Richard B. Primack
- Education: Duke University (PhD); Harvard University (BA)
- Awards: Guggenheim Fellowship; Humbolt Research Award; University Lecturer, Boston University
- Scientific career
- Fields: Conservation biology, plant ecology, climate change, tropical ecology
- Workplaces: Boston University
- Doctoral advisor: Janis Antonovics

Richard B. Primack is an American plant ecologist and conservation biologist whose research focuses on the effects of climate change on plants and animals of New England. Widely regarded as the father of modern conservation biology, he has worked as a professor of biology at Boston University since 1978.

Primack's book, Walden Warming, and much of his research draws on records kept by Henry David Thoreau and other 19th-century naturalists in Concord, Massachusetts. His lab group pioneered the use of non-traditional data sources to investigate the effects of climate change, including photographs, museum specimens, citizen science networks, naturalist diaries, and experiments using dormant twigs. He served as president of the Association for Tropical Biology and Conservation in 2003 and as editor-in-chief of Biological Conservation from 2008 to 2016. Primack is also the author of conservation biology textbooks used around the world.

== Early life and education ==
Primack grew up in Newton, Massachusetts and attended Newton South High School. He attended Harvard College, where he majored in biology. As a result of a course at the Harvard Forest, he decided to switch his career path from medicine to botany. For his undergraduate thesis, he surveyed the flora of the Hammond Woods and Webster Woods in Newton.

Primack attended graduate school at Duke University, where he completed his PhD in plant population biology with Janis Antonovics. Primack then carried out two post-doctoral research projects: the first studying mountain shrub ecology with David Lloyd at the University of Canterbury in New Zealand, and the second studying tropical ecology of forests in Sarawak, Malaysia with Peter Shaw Ashton at Harvard University.

== Research ==
Primack has authored or coauthored more than 210 peer-reviewed scientific papers and his writings have been cited more than 25,000 times. His most highly cited publications are his conservation biology textbooks, papers on the ecological effects of climate change on phenology, and papers on flower longevity and pollination ecology.

=== Impacts of climate change in eastern Massachusetts ===
Primack's most recent research focuses on the impacts of climate change on the flowering, fruiting, leaf out, and leaf senescence times of plants, the spring arrival and autumn departure of birds, and the timing and diversity of insects visiting flowers in Massachusetts. This research has focused on eastern Massachusetts because of the availability of historical natural history records in the region. These records include extensive records of flowering, leaf out, bird arrivals, and other phenological events made by Henry David Thoreau in the 1850s.

=== The role of botanical gardens in climate change research ===
Much of Primack's research has been carried out at botanical gardens, especially the Arnold Arboretum of Harvard University. He has written about the importance of botanical gardens in climate change research and has facilitated the creation of international networks of botanical gardens to investigate questions about how plants are responding to climate change.

=== Tropical forest biology ===
Primack has investigated how rain forests in Malaysian Borneo change over time in terms of species diversity and forest structure, and how selective logging affects these processes. Primack worked with Richard Corlett to write a book, Tropical Rain Forests: An Ecological and Biogeographical Comparison, contrasting tropical rain forests on different continents.

=== Impacts of COVID-19 pandemic on conservation ===
Primack has worked with colleagues to describe the impacts of the COVID-19 pandemic and the associated lockdowns and changes in human activity on conservation. These projects have examined impacts on US national parks, noise pollution, and the formation of social trails in protected areas.

=== Leading the scientific journal Biological Conservation ===
As editor-in-chief of Biological Conservation, Primack handled approximately 17,000 manuscripts, of which 3,000 were published following peer-review. During his tenure, the journal published special issues on a range of topics, including several that highlighted research of scientists from under-represented countries. Primack authored editorials and papers about the publication process and the careers of scientists, including pieces about the challenges faced by women ecologists and scientists from developing countries.

== Conservation biology textbook project ==
Primack authored two of the first textbooks in the field of conservation biology: Essentials of Conservation Biology and A Primer of Conservation Biology, both of which were published in multiple editions starting in 1993. More recently, he worked with coauthors to write newer textbooks: An Introduction to Conservation Biology, written with Anna Sher, and Conservation Biology, and advanced textbook written with Bradley Cardinale and Jed Murdoch.

Primack worked with co-authors in foreign countries to produce 38 foreign-language and international editions of these textbooks with local conservation examples. The intent was to support training in conservation biology and the protection of biodiversity worldwide. The most recent book from this project is a free online textbook, Conservation Biology in Sub-Saharan Africa, which has been downloaded more than 50,000 times.

== Teaching and outreach ==
At Boston University, Primack teaches courses in conservation biology and plant biology. Primack has appeared on major media outlets, including The New York Times, Boston Globe, and NPR, to discuss his research and to comment on stories related to on climate change, conservation, and ecology. He often gives talks to the public and writes for popular outlets. Primack has also collaborated with museums on exhibits featuring his research. And he is involved in local conservation in his hometown of Newton, Massachusetts.

== Awards ==
- Invited international member, Academia Europaea (2024)
- Brandwein Lecture, National Science Teachers Association (2022)
- Environmentalist of the Year Award, Newton Conservators (2020)
- George Mercer Award, Ecological Society of America (2020)
- Boston University Lecturer (2016)
- Charles Johnson Maynard Award, Newton Conservators (2015)
- Humboldt Research Award, Alexander von Humboldt Foundation (2014-2016)
- Honorary Fellow, Association for Tropical Biology and Conservation (2012)
- Distinguished Service Award, Society for Conservation Biology (2011)
- Guggenheim Fellow, John Simon Guggenheim Memorial Foundation (2006-2007)

== Select books ==
- An Introduction to Conservation Biology, 2nd edition (Sinauer Associates, 2020). ISBN 9781605358970
- Conservation Biology (Oxford University Press, 2020). ISBN 9781605357140
- Conservation Biology in Sub-Saharan Africa (Open Book Publishers, 2019). ISBN 9781783747528
- Walden Warming: Climate Change Comes to Thoreau's Woods (University of Chicago Press, 2014). ISBN 9780226062211
- Essentials of Conservation Biology, 6th edition (Sinauer Associates, 2014). ISBN 978-1-60535-289-3
- A Primer of Conservation Biology, 5th edition (Sinauer Associates, 2012). ISBN 9780878936236
- Tropical Rain Forests: An Ecological and Biogeographical Comparison (Wiley, 2011). ISBN 978-1-4443-9228-9
- Timber, Tourists, and Temples: Conservation and Development in the Maya Forest (Island Press, 1998). ISBN 9781610911153
- Ecology, Conservation, and Management of Southeast Asian Rainforests (Yale University Press, 1995). ISBN 9780300062342
- A Field Guide to Poisonous Plants and Mushrooms of North America (Stephen Greene Press, 1984). ISBN 9780828905312

== External references ==
- Official website
