= Brian A. Primack =

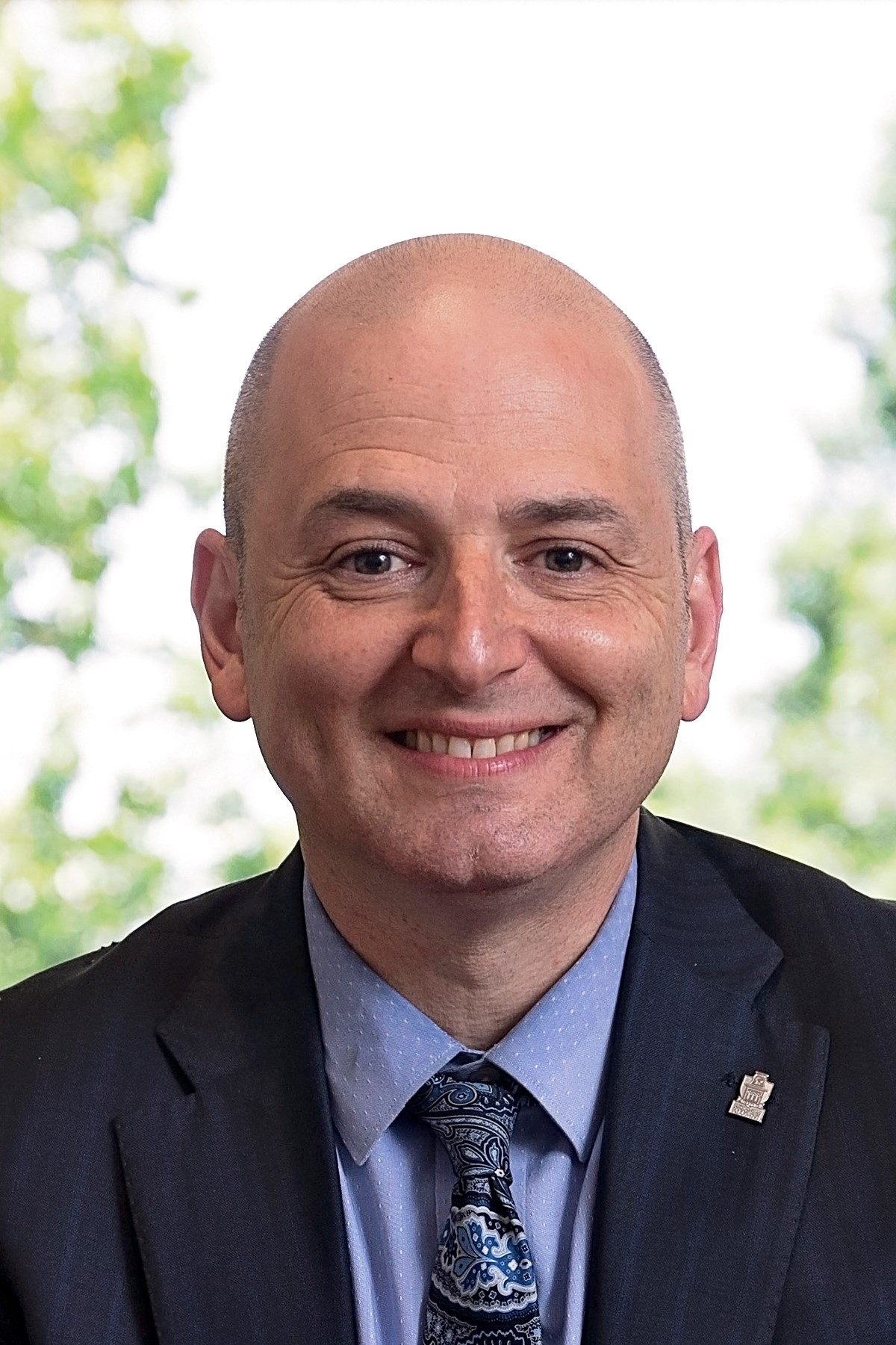

Dean of the College of Health at Oregon State University
- In office June 30, 2022 – May 17, 2024
- Preceded by: F. Javier Nieto
- Succeeded by: Richard A. Settersten, Jr., PhD

Personal details
- Born: April 22, 1969 (age 57)
- Education: Yale University; Harvard University; Emory University; University of Pittsburgh
- Profession: Professor

Brian A. Primack (born April 22, 1969) is a higher education administrator, medical researcher, author, and speaker with expertise in interrelationships among media, technology, and health. He is a professor at the College of Health at Oregon State University and formerly served as its dean from 2022 to 2024. He is the author of You Are What You Click: How Being Selective, Positive, and Creative Can Transform Your Social Media Experience.

== Education ==
Primack earned a B.A. in English and mathematics from Yale University (1991), an Ed.M. in education, human development, and psychology from Harvard University (1993), an M.D. from Emory University (1999), and a Ph.D. in clinical and translational science from the University of Pittsburgh (2011).

== Career ==
=== University of Pittsburgh ===
After completing medical residency in family medicine at UPMC St. Margaret Hospital in 2002, Primack joined the faculty of the University of Pittsburgh School of Medicine. In 2014, he became assistant vice chancellor for research on health and society and founding director of the Center for Research on Media, Technology and Health. He was promoted to full professor of medicine with tenure and secondary appointments in pediatrics and clinical and translational science in 2016.

In 2017, he was named the third dean of the University of Pittsburgh Honors College, where he also held the Bernice L. and Morton S. Lerner Endowed Chair.

=== University of Arkansas ===
In 2019, the University of Arkansas flagship campus named Primack the dean of its College of Education & Health Professions, the second-largest college at the university, with over 6000 students and about 500 faculty and staff members. He was holder of the Henry G. Hotz Endowed Chair and professor of public health with tenure. He was also awarded a secondary appointment as a professor in the Department of Internal Medicine at the University of Arkansas for Medical Sciences.

=== Oregon State University ===
In 2022, he became the third dean of the College of Health at Oregon State University. In this role, he led about 2400 undergraduate and graduate students and 150 faculty and staff members across two campuses studying in fields such as public health, exercise science, physical therapy, nutrition, and human development and family sciences. He stepped down as dean on May 17, 2024, and continues at the university as a professor of public health.

=== Research and scholarship ===
Primack has more than 250 peer-reviewed publications in areas spanning public health, behavioral science, substance use, mental health, and education. Primack's research has focused on interrelationships between media, technology, and health, both physical and mental. His research into alternative tobacco and nicotine products such as hookahs and electronic nicotine delivery systems has heightened public knowledge and influenced policy measures. He has also studied social media and mental health outcomes including depression, anxiety, and loneliness. Other areas of study include racial disparities in tobacco marketing, relationships between media use and health behaviors, and leveraging innovations in media literacy education to improve health education. He has also spoken at TEDMED about video games and health behavior change. He is the author of You Are What You Click: How Being Selective, Positive, and Creative Can Transform Your Social Media Experience, which was published in 2021 by Chronicle Books.

== Honors and awards ==
The Society of Adolescent Health and Medicine honored him with the Charles E. Irwin New Investigator Award in 2006, and the Society of Behavioral Medicine honored him with its Early Career Investigator Award in 2010. His 2017 publication on social media and social isolation was named the American Journal of Preventive Medicine's most impactful article of the year. He was elected into the American Society for Clinical Investigation in 2019. His book You Are What You Click was selected by Malcolm Gladwell, Adam Grant, Susan Cain, and Daniel Pink as a nominee for the 2021 Next Big Idea Club Award for nonfiction. Cloud Lake Literary named You Are What You Click a best read for 2021, and Publishers Weekly said that the book "hits the sweet spot, offering small steps to empower readers while breezily educating on how social media influences their health."
