= Arnold Arboretum =

Botanical garden in Boston, Massachusetts

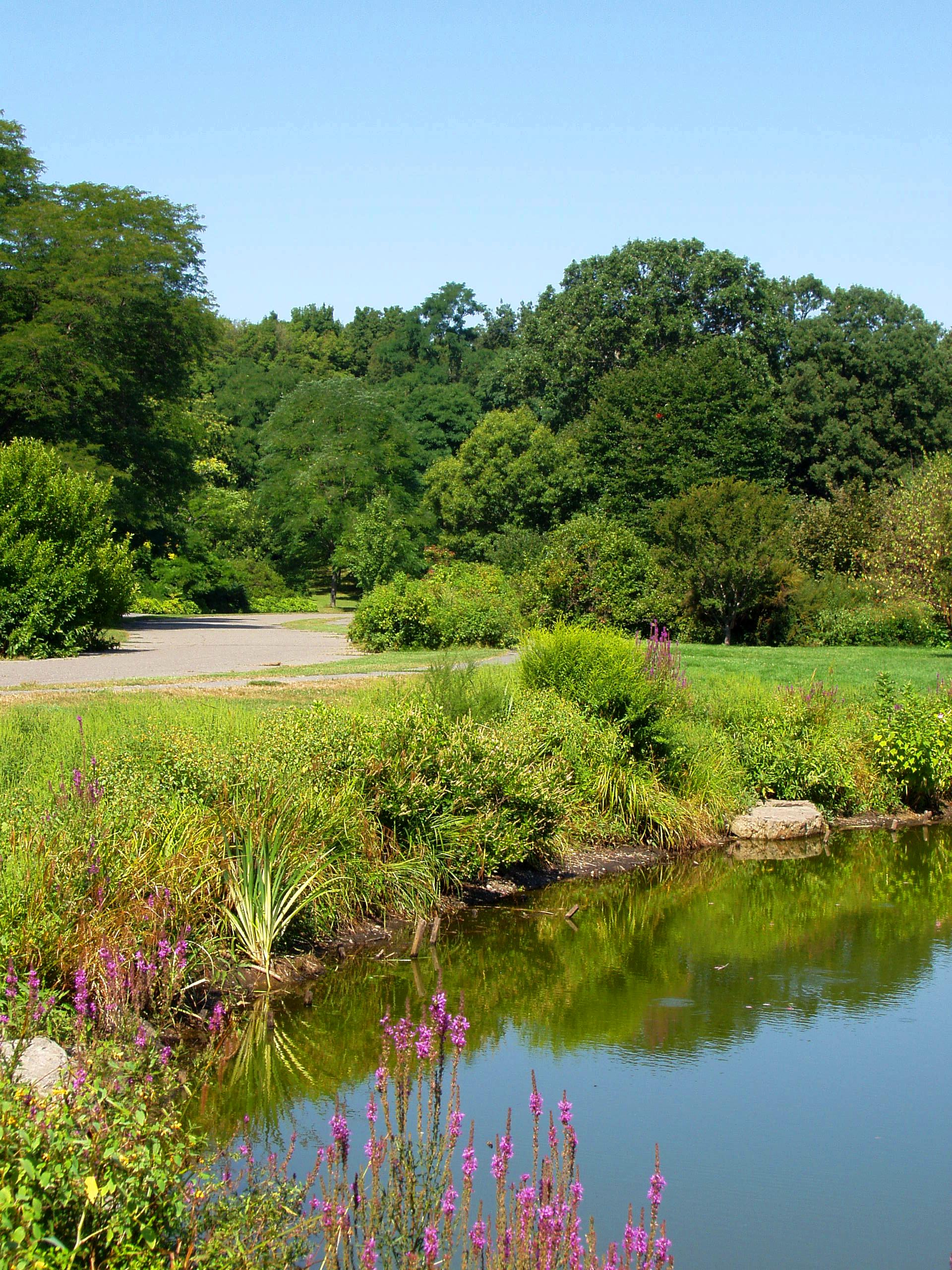
- One of the small ponds within Arnold Arboretum

- Location within Greater Boston area Location within Massachusetts Location within the United States
- Type: Botanical garden
- Location: Boston, Massachusetts, U.S.
- Coordinates: 42°17′52″N 71°7′22″W
- Area: 281 acres (114 ha)
- Operator: Harvard University
- Status: Open year round
- Website: www.arboretum.harvard.edu
- Arnold Arboretum
- U.S. National Register of Historic Places
- U.S. National Historic Landmark
- Boston Landmark
- Built: 1872
- Architect: Frederick Law Olmsted
- NRHP reference No.: 66000127

Significant dates
- Added to NRHP: October 15, 1966
- Designated NHL: January 12, 1965
- Designated BOSL: June 26, 2007 (Lewis-Dawson Farmhouse)

The Arnold Arboretum is a botanical research institution and free public park affiliated with Harvard University and located in the Jamaica Plain and Roslindale neighborhoods of Boston.

Established in 1872, it is the oldest public arboretum in North America. The landscape was designed by Charles Sprague Sargent and Frederick Law Olmsted and is the second largest "link" in the Emerald Necklace. The Arnold Arboretum's collection of temperate trees, shrubs, and vines has an emphasis on the plants of the eastern North America and eastern Asia, where Arboretum staff and colleagues are sourcing new material on plant collecting expeditions. The Arboretum supports research in its landscape and in its Weld Hill Research Building.

== History ==
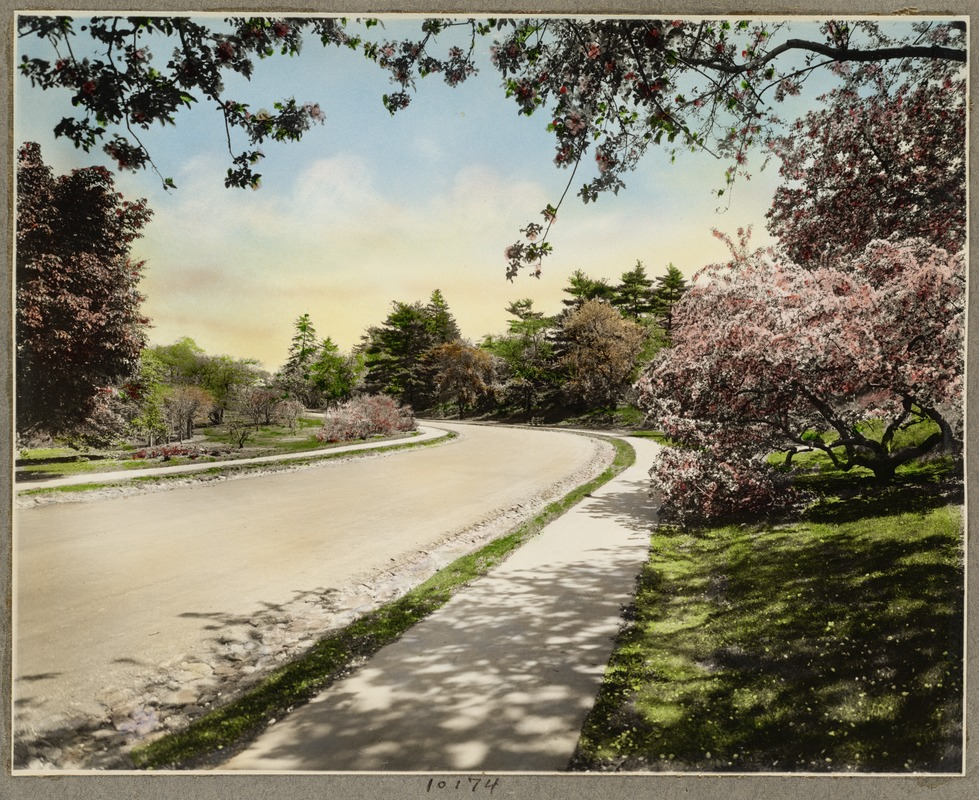
Arnold Arboretum in 1921

The Arboretum was founded in 1872. It was established through land and financial gifts from Benjamin Bussey and James Arnold, with trustee George Barrell Emerson facilitating its creation. Harvard appointed Charles Sprague Sargent as the first director, who partnered with landscape architect Frederick Law Olmsted to design the grounds. A unique agreement with the City of Boston ensured public access through a 1,000-year lease.

In the late 19th and early 20th centuries, the Arboretum became a center for botanical research, with Sargent publishing The Silva of North America and launching Garden and Forest. Inspired by his travels to Japan, the Arboretum began decades of plant collection in East Asia, led by botanists like Ernest Henry Wilson.

The Great Depression and World War II paused international collecting, shifting focus to landscape preservation and public education. The mid-20th century brought innovations in plant cultivation, with the 1962 construction of the Dana Greenhouses supporting horticultural research.

Plant exploration resumed in the 1970s, particularly in China, with partnerships like the Sino-American Botanical Expedition. In 2011, the Weld Hill Research Building opened, advancing scientific study. During the COVID-19 pandemic, the Arboretum remained open as a vital public refuge.

In 2022, the Arboretum celebrated its 150th anniversary, reaffirming its mission of research, conservation, and free public access. Today, it continues to serve as a leading institution in botanical science and education.

== Location ==
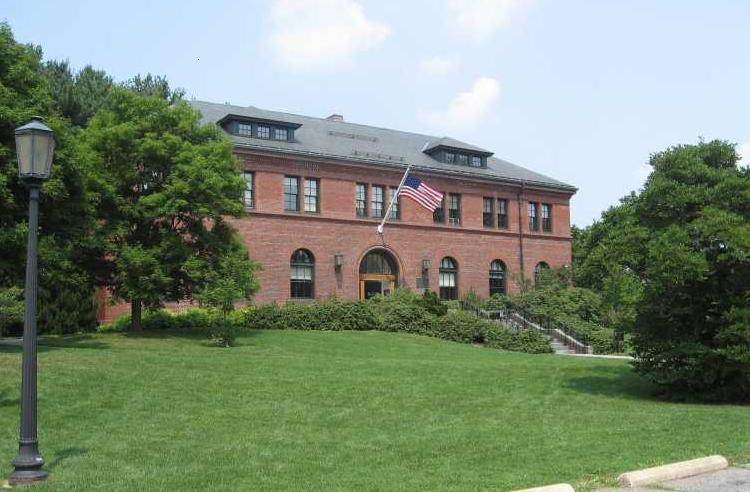
Hunnewell Building, Arnold Arboretum

The Arboretum occupies 281 acres in the Jamaica Plain and Roslindale sections of Boston. The Visitor Center is located at the Hunnewell Administration Building at 125 Arborway. The Arboretum contains four notable hills: Bussey Hill, Peters Hill, Hemlock Hill, and Weld Hill. Of these, Peters Hill is the tallest at 240 feet (73 meters).

=== Climate ===
The Arboretum is located in USDA hardiness zone 6b (0 to −5 °F; −18 to −21 °C).

== Collections ==
The Arnold Arboretum maintains over 17,000 plants across roughly 10,000 accessions, emphasizing North American and East Asian ligneous species. Historic collections include plant introductions by Charles Sprague Sargent, Ernest Henry Wilson, William Purdom, Joseph Hers, and Joseph Rock, with recent expeditions to China, Taiwan, Japan, and Korea contributing to its diversity.

Key plant collections focus on Acer, Fagus, Carya, Forsythia, Pinus, Magnolia, Quercus, Rhododendron, Syringa, and Tsuga, along with specialized collections such as the Bradley Collection of Rosaceous Plants, conifers, and Larz Anderson Bonsai Collection. Around 500 new accessions are processed annually.

The Index Herbarioum code "A" is assigned to the Arboretum. Its research mission centers on woody plant evolution and biogeography, with studies in molecular genetics, plant-water relations, and environmental change.

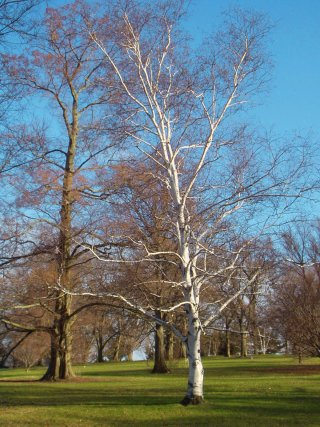
A birch tree in early spring

=== Plant records ===
Plant records are maintained on a computerized database, BG-BASE (BG-BASE Inc.), which was initiated in 1985 at the request of the Arnold Arboretum and the Threatened Plants Unit (TPU) of the World Conservation Monitoring Centre (WCMC). Currently the Arboretum uses a suite of ESRI Desktop and Mobile GIS software applications to manage, analyze, query, capture, manipulate, and display geographic information. A computer-driven embosser generates records labels. All accessioned plants in the collections are labeled with accession number, botanical name, source information, common name, and map location.

=== Nursery and greenhouse ===
The Dana Greenhouses located at 1050 Centre Street (with a mailing address of 125 Arborway), were completed in 1962. Also located in the greenhouse complex is the bonsai and penjing pavilion, where the Larz Anderson Bonsai Collection is displayed from the middle of April to the end of October.

=== Associated collections ===
The Arboretum's herbarium holds specimens of cultivated plants that relate to the living collections. The herbarium, horticultural library, archives, and photographs are maintained in the Hunnewell building at 125 Arborway; however, the main portions of the herbarium and library collections are housed in Cambridge on the campus of Harvard University.

== Activities ==
=== Research ===
The Arboretum offers various programs to support scholars at different stages, including fellowships and awards for students, postdoctoral researchers, and professionals. Notably, the DaRin Butz Foundation Research Internship Program provides undergraduates with hands-on research experience, while the Deland Award and Cunin/Sigal Research Award offer financial support for student research projects. Additionally, the Arboretum's library and archives serve as valuable resources for botanical studies.

=== Education ===
The Arboretum offers a variety of education programs for students, educators, professionals, and the public. School programs include guided field trips and a summer science program for middle schoolers, while professional development opportunities support educators in outdoor learning. Horticultural training includes internships and fellowships for students and early-career professionals. Family and community programs encourage nature exploration, and adult education offers lectures, workshops, and tours on plant science and conservation.

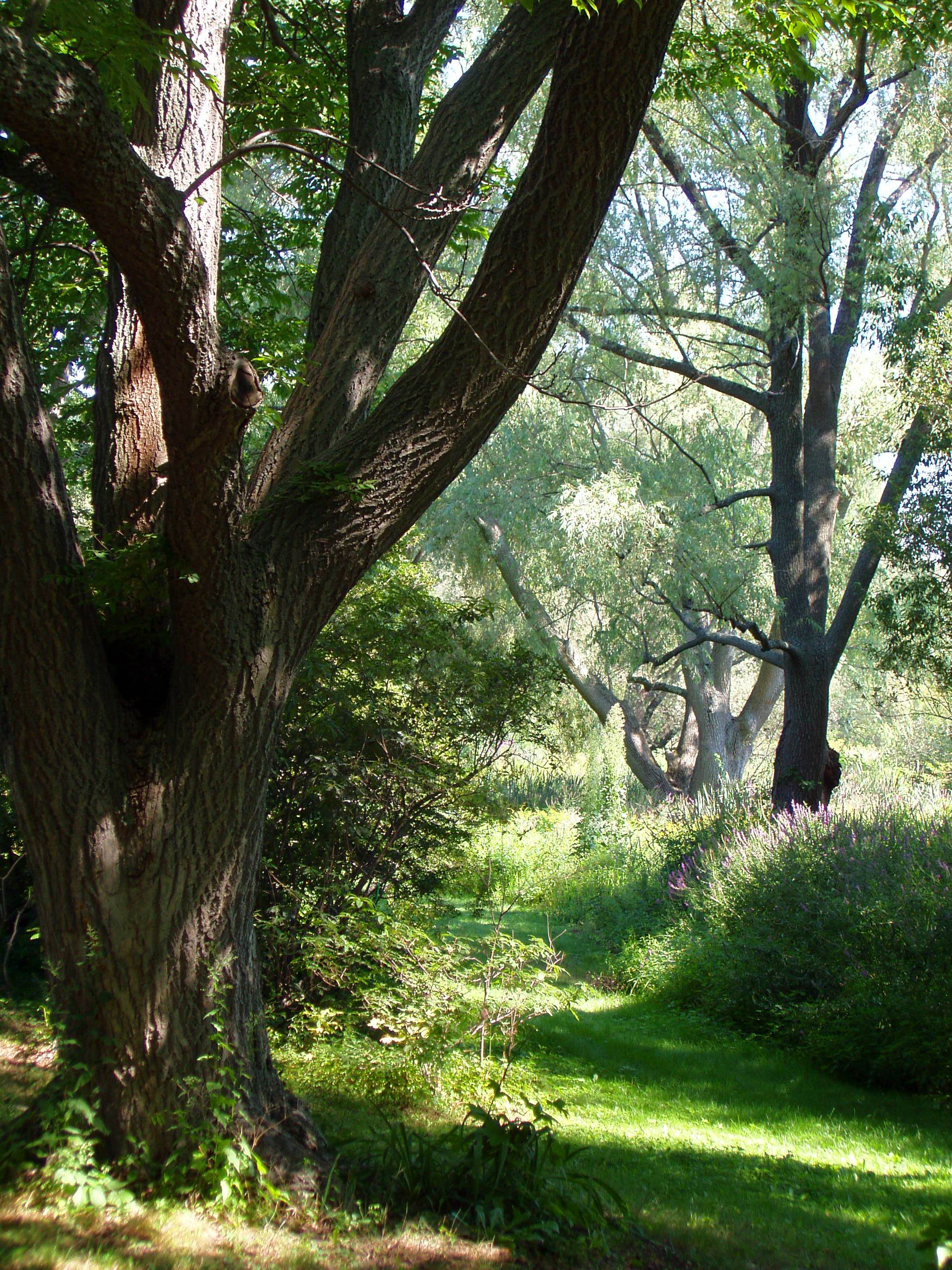
General view of Arnold Arboretum

=== Horticulture ===
A team of horticulturists, arborists, gardeners, seasonal employees, and summer interns maintain the grounds. A wide array of vehicles and modern equipment, are used in grounds maintenance.

=== Lilac Sunday ===
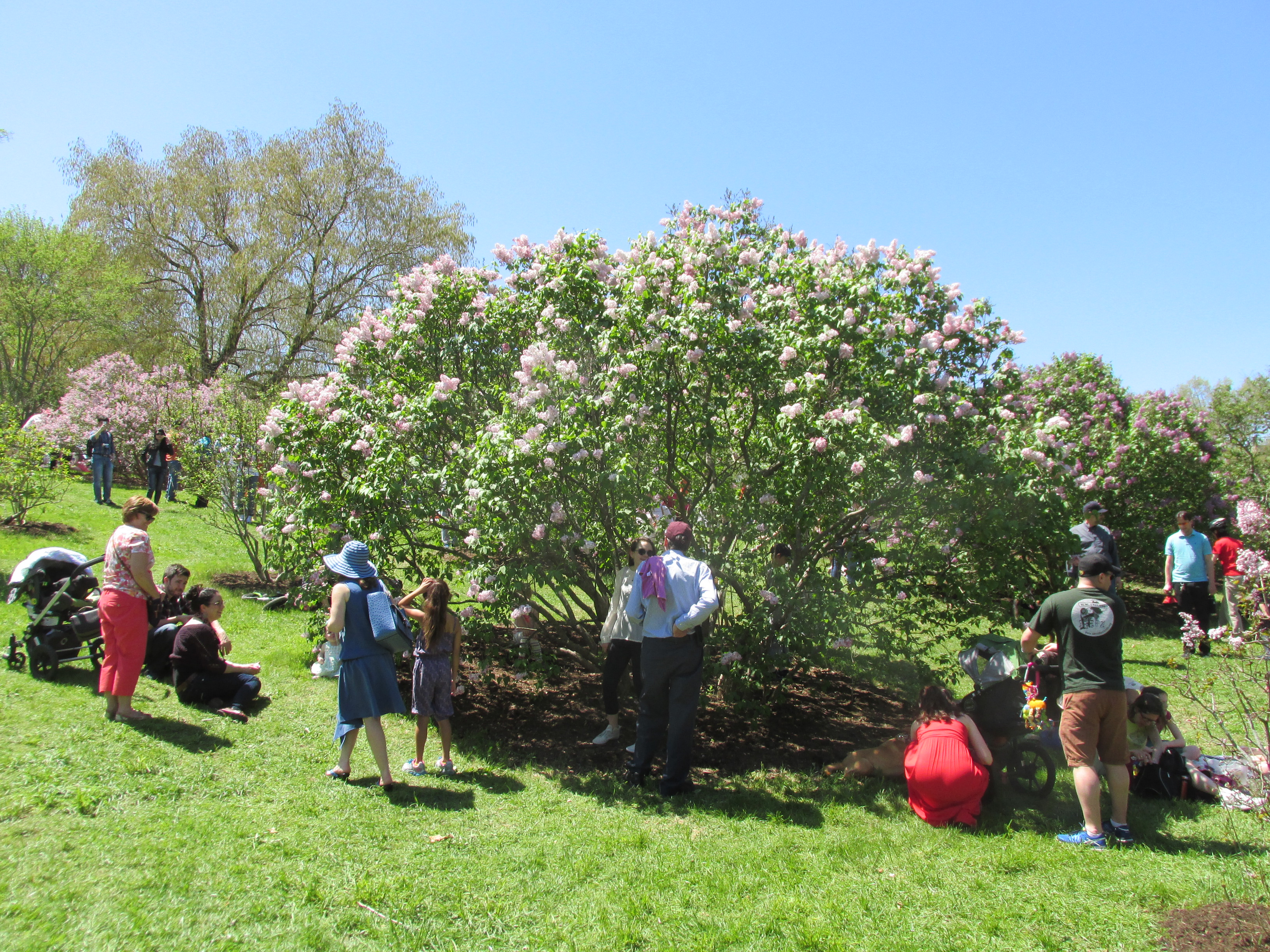
Lilac Sunday

The second Sunday in May every year is "Lilac Sunday"—a celebration with tours, hands-on children's programming, arts programming, and picnicking. In 2008, on the 100th anniversary of Lilac Sunday, the Arboretum website touted:

Of the thousands of flowering plants in the Arboretum, only one, the lilac, is singled out each year for a daylong celebration. On Lilac Sunday, garden enthusiasts from all over New England gather at the Arboretum to picnic and tour the lilac collection. On the day of the event, which takes place rain or shine, the Arboretum is open as usual from dawn to dusk.

=== Publications ===
Arnoldia is the quarterly member magazine of the Arboretum, dedicated to exploring the nature of trees. Established in 1911 as the Bulletin of Popular Information, it has evolved into a forum for discussions on temperate woody plants and their landscapes. The magazine features stories of plant exploration, insights into botanical research, and explorations of the history of gardens, landscapes, and science. In 2022, as part of the Arboretum's sesquicentennial celebration, Arnoldia relaunched with a new approach, expanding its scope to include poetry, visual art, and literary essays. Readers can access digitized back issues dating back to its inception.

=== Institutional collaborations ===
The Arboretum maintains an institutional membership in the American Public Garden Association, Botanic Gardens Conservation International, and the International Association of Botanical Gardens and Arboreta. Additionally, members of the staff are associated with many national and international botanical and horticultural organizations. The Arboretum also works with the Center for Plant Conservation, the Plant Collections Network, and the North America-China Plant Exploration Consortium on domestic and international plant conservation initiatives.

== See also ==
- The Landscape Institute at the BAC (formerly operated by the Arnold Arboretum, and before that by Radcliffe College)
- Larz Anderson Bonsai Collection, donated by businessman and ambassador Larz Anderson
- List of botanical gardens in the United States
- List of National Historic Landmarks in Boston
- National Register of Historic Places listings in southern Boston, Massachusetts
- North American Plant Collections Consortium
