= Shukra-Niti =

Part of Dharmasastra

Shukranīti (शुक्रनीति–Śukranīti), also known as Shukranītisara (शुक्रनीतिसार–Śukranītiśāstra) and Shukracharya's System of Morals, is a part of the Dharmasastra. It is a treatise on government, instructing how to use political theory to uphold morality. The code is authored by Shukracharya, also known as Usanas, and was claimed to have been written during the Vedic period. However, modern historians claim the composition could date as early as the 4th century CE. The term Niti is derived from the Sanskrit word which translates to to lead. Shukra-Niti focuses on morality, which it states to be vital for the overall well being of the people and the state (Rajya). Thus, the ruler must regulate the economic, social, and political aspects of human activity. According to the Shukranīti, the main responsibilities of the king should be towards the protection of his subjects and punishment of the offenders, and such actions cannot be enacted without a guideline (Niti). According to Shukracharya: a person can live without grammar, logic, and Vedanta, but cannot do in absence of Niti, and describes it as an essential aspect required for maintaining social order in the society.

== History ==
=== Claims of much later period of origin ===
Lallanji Gopal disputes the origin of Shukra-Niti to the Vedic period and claims the work was written far later. This is due to the mention of guns, gunpowder, and cannons in the work. Modern historians argue that although some incendiary arrows were used in ancient India, there were no mentions of fire-arms using gunpowder in those texts. Historically, guns were introduced to India by the Portuguese in the early 16th century and later used in the first Battle of Panipat. Hence, according to them, the origin of the Shukranīti is attributed to the 16th century CE. Similarly, J C. Ray places the origin to 11th century CE based on the use of the word Yavana and Mleccha in the text. According to him, the term Yavana or Mleccha refers to Greeks and Muslims respectively during the 11th century, as by then Muslims (such as Mahmud of Ghazni) had spread to most parts of India. Some historians, based on the reference made to various classifications of punishment meted out to the offenders and on other regulations mentioned in the Shukranīti, conclude that the work was modern in approach, hence a nineteenth-century composition.

=== Claims of origin from Vedic period ===
Dr. Gustav Oppert, who was the first to compile and edit the original work of Shukracharya's Shukranīti in Sanskrit, placed the origin of the work to the Vedic period. According to some scholarly interpretations, the Shukranīti is frequently mentioned in Hindu epics like Ramayana and Mahabharata and was originally written by Brahma in a voluminous 100,000 chapters, which later was reduced to a readable one thousand chapters by Shukracharya. Dr. Oppert in his other work on ancient India further elaborates on the much contentious issue on the mention of the use of firearms in Shukranīti. He provides archaeological evidences from the ancient temple carvings in India, where soldiers are depicted carrying and in some cases firing firearms. Thus, he claims that the use of firearms in Shukranīti is authentic and establishes the use of firearms, gunpowder in India since the ancient Vedic period. This theory is further supported by some modern historians, in which the use of gunpowder, firearms, and cannons are described as weapons used in warfare in some Vedic literature. On the issue of antiquity, R. G Pradhan observes, given that the more recent work, the Kamandaka Nitisara, draws from the Shukranīti, the age of the Shukraniti must precede it. Similarly, other historians, on the basis that Kautilyas Arthashastra opens with salutations to Shukracharya and Brhaspati, conclude that the Shukraniti has to be older than the Arthashastra and place the origin of Shukracharya's work to be of 4th-century BCE.

== Overview ==
The Shukranīti as a comprehensive codebook lays out guidelines in both political and non-political aspects required to maintain social order in the state. The political part of the book addresses guidelines for a king, the council of ministers, the justice system, and international laws. The non-political part addresses morality, economics, architecture, and other social and religious laws. These laws are elaborately enshrined into five chapters in this epic.

- The first chapter details the duties and functions of the king.
- The second elaborates on the duties of the crown prince and other administrators of the state.
- The third chapter puts forth the general rules of morality.
- The fourth is the largest chapter in the work, which is divided into seven parts.

- The first subsection describes the maintenance of the treasury.
- The second addresses social customs and institutions in the kingdom.
- The third subsection addresses the arts and sciences.
- The fourth lays out the guidelines for the characteristics required for a king's friend.
- The fifth subsection describes the functions and duties of the king.
- The sixth addresses the maintenance and security of forts.
- The seventh subsection lays out the functions and composition of the army.

- The concluding chapter five deals with miscellaneous and supplementary rules on morality as laid down in Shastras to promote the overall welfare of the people and the state.

== Relevance ==
Though the book has centuries of history attached to it, the contents of it are still relevant in current-day politics, especially in the Indian context. Shukracharya lays out the virtues and qualities required in the king and crown prince, which would make a liberal and democratic leader. Most of the verses of chapter I and II are considered relevant in current day administrations of any democratic state in the world. For example, in chapter 2, the codebook states that the king should not take any policy decisions unilaterally without consulting his council of ministers, and that a ruler who arbitrarily makes decisions will be alienated from his kingdom and his people. Similarly, the Shukranīti places people as the ultimate source of a king's power. In chapter-I, it states that the ruler a servant of the people. One of the most discussed topics relevant to current times is the stress given on Karma. The book further advises the king to appoint his subordinates in any post irrespective of his jāti.

== Bibliography ==
- Gopal, Lallanji (1962). "The Śukraniti— a Nineteenth-Century Text". Bulletin of the School of Oriental and African Studies. 25 (3): 524–556. doi:10.1017/S0041977X00069494. ISSN 0041-977X. S2CID 162793107.
- Sarkar, Benoy Kumar (1913), Sukra-niti-sara.
- Oppert, Gustav Salomon (1880), On the Weapons, Army Organisation, and Political Maxims of the Ancient Hindus: With Special Reference to Gunpowder and Firearms, Higginbotham, p. 162
- Nagar, Vandana (1985), Kingship in the Śukra-nīti, Pushpa Prakashan
