= Nitisara =

Ancient Indian treatise by Kamandaka

Nitisara (transl. Essence of Statesmanship) or the Nitisara of Kamandaki, is an ancient Indian treatise on politics and statecraft. It was authored by Kamandaka, also known as Kamandaki or Kamandakiya, traditionally identified as a disciple of Vishnugupta (Kautilya). It is traditionally dated to the 4th-3rd century BCE, though modern scholarship variously dates it to between the 3rd and 7th centuries CE between Gupta and Harsha period and its in fact a recension based on Sukra Nitisara of 4th century BCE. It contains 19 sections. The work has been dedicated to Chandragupta of Pataliputra.

== Date ==
The Kāmandakīya Nītisāra is considered to be a post-Mauryan treatise for it refers to the Mauryan emperor Chandragupta by name. The historian K.P Jayaswal attributes the text to the Gupta age (3rd–6th century CE).

It is possible to fix a terminus ante quem of the 7th century CE for the text, since the 7th-century poet Bhavabhuti refers to a Kamandaka who is described as proficient in the art of diplomacy. The Nītīsāra is also cited at the end of the first chapter of the Dasakumāracarita of Daṇḍin who lived in the latter half of the 6th century CE. Therefore, the text may have been composed anytime between the 3rd century BCE and the 7th century CE.

== Structure ==
Nitisara contains 20 sargas (chapters) and 36 prakarans. It is based on the Arthasastra of Kautilya and deals with various social elements such as theories of social order, structure of the state, obligations of the ruler, governmental organization, principles and policies of the government, interstate relationships, ethics of envoys and spies, application of different political expedients, varieties of battle arrays, attitude towards morality, and so forth.

== Similarities with Arthasastra ==
Nitisara shares several common aspects with Arthasastra including mastering of control over the senses including practicing of ahimsa; maintaining balance among dharma, artha and kama; emphasizing the importance of knowledge and intelligence; the seven prakrits and twelve vijigisus in a circle of kings or mandala theory; six measures of foreign policy; the upayas in which there is no war mongering and use of force as the last resort; issues of disasters (vysanas) that may afflict the constituent elements (prakrits) and how to overcome them prior to the execution of a policy; duties of diplomats and intelligence gathering; and aspects of war and use of power by sticking to the priorities of mantra-shakti (counsel or diplomacy), prabhav-shakti (economic and military power), and utsah-shakti (leadership).

Nitisara differs from Arthasastra in that the former focuses on valour and the military qualities of the ruler, whereas the latter was dependent on deliverance of kingly duties.

== Translations ==
Nitisara of Kamandaka has been translated into Telugu language by Jakkaraju Venkatakavi, which is preserved in Tanjore Sarasvati Mahal Library. It was critically edited by Veturi Prabhakara Sastri and published by S. Gopalan in 1950. It was published by Tirumala Tirupati Devasthanams in 2013.

== See also ==
- Artha and puruṣārtha, Indian philosophical concepts in the text
- Hindu philosophy
