= Government Oriental Library =

Government Oriental Library may refer to:

- Government Oriental Library of Ceylon
- Government Oriental Library of Mysore
