= R. Shamasastry =

Indian Sanskritist (1868-1944)

Rudrapatna Shamasastry FRAS (1868–1944) was a Sanskrit scholar and librarian at the Oriental Research Institute Mysore. He re-discovered and published the Arthashastra, an ancient Indian treatise on statecraft, economic policy, and military strategy.

== Early life ==
Shamasastry was born in 1868 in Rudrapatna, a village on the banks of the Kaveri river in what is today the state of Karnataka. His early education started in Rudrapatna. He later went to the Mysore Samskruta Patasala and obtained his Sanskrit Vidwat degree with high honours. In 1889, Madras University awarded him a BA degree. Impressed by his ability in classical Sanskrit, Sir Sheshadri Iyer, the then Dewan of Mysore State, nurtured and helped Shamasastry, making it possible for him to join the Government Oriental Library in Mysore as a librarian. He "had mastered Vedas, Vedanga, classical Sanskrit, Prakrit, English, Kannada, German, French and other languages." Shamasatry further completed his PhD.

== The Arthashastra ==
The Oriental Research Institute was established as the Mysore Oriental Library in 1891. It houses thousands of Sanskrit palm-leaf manuscripts. As a librarian, Shamasastry examined these fragile manuscripts daily to determine and catalogue their contents.

In 1905, Shamasastry discovered the Arthashastra among a heap of manuscripts. He transcribed, edited and published the Sanskrit edition in 1909. He proceeded to translate it into English, publishing it in 1915. The original manuscript's condition is tenuous, as indicated by S.A Krishnaiah, a member of the Mysore Oriental Research Institute (MRI) committee.

The manuscript was in the Early Grantha script. Other copies of the Arthashastra were discovered later in other parts of India.

It was one of the manuscripts in the library that had been handed over by a pandit from Tanjore district to the Oriental Library.

Until this discovery, the Arthashastra was known only through references to it in works, including those by Dandin, Bana, Vishnusarma, Mallinathasuri, Megasthenes, as well as others. This discovery was "an epoch-making event in the history of the study of ancient Indian polity". It altered the perception of ancient India and changed the course of history studies, notably the false belief of European scholars at the time that Indians learnt the art of administration from the Greeks.

The book was translated into French, German and many other languages.

== Other work ==
He started his career as a Librarian at the Government Mysore Oriental Library. From 1912–1918, he worked as a Principal at the Sri Chamarajendra Samskrita Maha Patashala in Bengaluru. In the year 1918, he returned to the Government Mysore Oriental library and joined as a Curator and later as the Director of Archeological Research in Mysore, where he would continue to work until his retirement in 1929. Apart from discovering Kautilya's Arthashastra, he pursued his research in the Vedic era and Vedic astronomy, making valuable contributions to Vedic studies. The following are among Shamasastry's works:

1. Vedangajyautishya – A Vedic Manual of Astronomy, 8th Century B.C.
2. Drapsa: The Vedic Cycle of Eclipses – a key to unlock the treasures of the Vedas.
3. Eclipse-Cult in the Vedas, Bible, and Koran – A supplement to the Drapsa. It is this Cult which gave rise to the Epic and Puranic tales in India. The mathematical aspect of eclipse-cycles is treated at great length and eclipse-tables have been appended. Dr. E. Abegg, Professor, University of Zurich, Switzerland, stated- 'I see with admiration that R Shamasatry is a thorough scholar in the difficult problems of Vedic Astronomy and Calendars, things which European Indianists have very rarely true Knowledge of'
4. Gavam Ayana - The Vedic Era - is an exposition of a forgotten sacrificial calendar of the Vedic poets and includes an account of the origin of the Yugas.
5. Evolution of Indian Polity. This book is a compilation of ten lectures delivered at Calcutta University. Sir Asutosh Mookerjee, Vice-chancellor of Calcutta University, personally invited Sastry to deliver these lectures. In this work, the ancient Indian administrative systems and various levels of administrative set-up were critically examined, on the basis of Vedas, legends, Arthashastra, Mahabharata, Jainagama works etc.
6. The Origin of Devanagari Alphabets.

All his works received great attention from many great Scholars around the world, particularly European Indologists.

R. Shamasastry also edited many Kannada Texts. Some of the important works he published are:

- Rudrabhaṭṭa's Jagannāthavijaya (1923)
- Nayasena's Dharmāmṛta (part I in 1924 & part II 1926)
- Lingannakavi's Keḷadinṛpavijaya (1921)
- Govindavaidya's Kaṇṭhīravanarasarajavijaya (1926)
- The Virāṭa Parva of Kumāravyāsa's Karnataka Mahābhārata (1920)
- The Udyoga Parva of Kumārayvāsa's Karnataka Mahābhārata (1922)

== Awards ==
Shamasastry's work was acclaimed by Ashutosh Mukherjee, Rabindranath Tagore, and others. Shamasastry also met Mahatma Gandhi in 1927 at Nandi Hills. The discovery brought international fame to the institute.

Outside India, Shamasastry's discovery was hailed by Indologists and Orientalists such as Julius Jolly, Moriz Winternitz, F. W. Thomas, Paul Pelliot, Arthur Berriedale Keith, Sten Konow and others. J. F. Fleet wrote of Shamasastry: "We are, and shall always remain, under a great obligation to him for a most important addition to our means of studying the general history of ancient India."

Shamasastry was awarded a doctorate in 1919 from the Oriental University in Washington D.C. and in 1921 from Calcutta University. He was made a Fellow of the Royal Asiatic Society and won the Campbell Memorial gold medal.

Several titles were also conferred on him, including Arthashastra Visharada by the Maharaja of Mysore, Mahamahopadhyaya by the Government of India and Vidyalankara and Panditaraja by the Varanasi Sanskrit Mandali.

== Recognition in Germany ==
An often-told anecdote involves the visit of the then-king of Mysore, Krishna Raja Wadiyar IV, to Germany. When introduced as the king of Mysore, he was asked by the vice-chancellor of a German university whether he was from the Mysore of Shamasastry. On his return, the king honoured Shamasastry and said "In Mysore we are the Maharaja and you are our subject, but in Germany, you are the master and people recognise us by your name and fame."

== Later life ==
Shamasastry continued his research work in Indology. He later became the curator of the institute. As the Director of Archaeology of Mysore State, he discovered many inscriptions on stone and copper plates.

His house Asutosh, in the Chamundipuram locality of Mysore, was named after Sir Asutosh Mookerjee.
