= Upayas (diplomacy) =

Hindu and Jain method of diplomacy

Upāya (Sanskrit: उपाय) is a Sanskrit word that means "remedy", "to come into any state or condition" and "to come near or towards". It also refers to methods of diplomacy found in Hindu and Jain texts. These four approaches are commonly referred as Chaturvidhopāya (lit. 'four-fold idea'.

== Descriptions ==
Avoid War

One can lose a war as easily as one can win.
War is inherently unpredictable.
War is also expensive. Avoid war.
Try Upaya (four strategies).
Then Sadgunya* (six forms of non-war pressure).
Understand the opponent and seek to outwit him.
When everything fails, resort to military force.

— Arthashastra

Kautilya mentioned four Upayas - Sama, Dana or Dama, Danda and Bheda as ways to solve state politics to avoid conflicts and war situations (Arthashastra 2.10.47). This phrase is also commonly used when you need to find a solution to a problem anyhow.

1. Sāma, the first step, means conciliation or alliances. When conflict arises between states, the first step is to talk. There are five types of conciliations: praising the person, referring to a relationship (for example, marriage), pointing out common benefits, telling what might happen in future if something is done in a specific way, and lastly putting oneself at the other's disposal (Arthashastra 2.10.48-53).
2. Dāna, the second, means gifts or compensation (Arthashastra 2.10.54). Sometimes it is referred to as Dama, price, which means to pay the value.
3. Bheda, refers to the usage of logic or trickery, influencing the mind. Creating dissension and discord in the enemy (Arthashastra 2.10.55).
4. Danda refers to force or armaments. To take up war with the opposite state. Using military force is the last resort. There are three types of Dandas: killing, tormenting and plundering (Arthashastra 2.10.56).

All of the above four Upayas are generally spoken together in a single colloquial phrase: "Sama Dana Bheda Dandopaya." This is a very common quote used all over India to suggest resolving any conflict.

An article on Institute for Defense Studies and Analyses website states that the 20th-century power-politics theoretician Hans J. Morgenthau suggests four similar methods in a struggle for the balance of power: Divide and Rule; Compensation; Armaments; and Alliances.

These four approaches are found in the Hindu Itihasa (epics) and the Dharmasastras, as well as the Jain text Nitivakyamitra.

== See also ==
- Agni Purana
- Upaya- used in Buddhism to indicate the methods of Buddhas and Bodhisattvas
- Ahimsa
