= Frenemy =

Type of friend and enemy

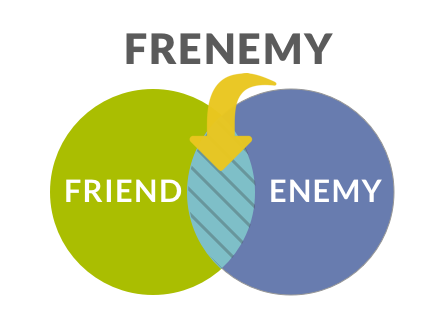

Frenemy is a portmanteau of the words friend and enemy that refers to "a person whom one is friendly with, despite a dislike or rivalry" or "a person who combines the characteristics of a friend and an enemy".

The term is used to describe personal, geopolitical and commercial relationships both among individuals and groups or institutions. According to communication scholars, Carol Mills and Paul Mongeau, in interpersonal relationships, frenemyships are often maintained because the "relational benefits (e.g., saving face, maintaining social networks, and sustaining potential instrumental connections) outweigh negative ramifications of dealing with the relationship or terminating it". In these relationships, parties engage in civil interaction in public, but fundamentally distrust or dislike one another.

== History ==
Both Merriam-Webster and the Oxford English Dictionary date the earliest known print appearance of "frienemies" to 1891, in a Norton, Kansas, newspaper article about "George A. Spaulding, the Machiavelian diplomatist of Phillipsburg", who was attending to legal matters "not in the hands of his frienemies". In 1953, the word, with identical spelling, appears in an article titled "Howz [sic] about calling the Russians our Frienemies?" by the American gossip columnist Walter Winchell in the Nevada State Journal.

The spelling frenemy was used in the newspaper article "The Best of Frenemies" by Jessica Mitford, published in 1977. She claimed that the word had been "coined by one of [her] sisters when she was a small child to describe a rather dull little girl who lived near us. My sister and the frenemy played together constantly ... all the time disliking each other heartily."

== People ==
A Businessweek article stated that frenemies in the workplace are common, even in business to business partnerships. Due to increasingly informal environments and the "abundance of very close, intertwined relationships that bridge people's professional and personal lives ... [while] it certainly wasn't unheard of for people to socialize with colleagues in the past, the sheer amount of time that people spend at work now has left a lot of people with less time and inclination to develop friendships outside of the office".

Professional relationships are successful when two or more business partners come together and benefit from one another, but personal relationships require more common interests outside of business. Relationships in the workplace, in a sports club, or any place that involves performance comparing, form because of the commonalities between persons. Due to the intense environment, competitiveness can evolve into envy and strain a relationship. Frenemy type relationships become routine and common because of the shared interest of business dealings or competition.

Sigmund Freud said of himself that "an intimate friend and a hated enemy have always been indispensable to my emotional life…not infrequently…friend and enemy have coincided in the same person".

== Types ==
Art of fictional meeting of Mary, Queen of Scots with frenemy Elizabeth I

Frenemies can be divided into different categories based on their behaviors:

- Unfiltered/Undermining frenemy: This type of frenemy insults, makes fun of, and cracks sarcastic jokes about the friend so frequently that it gets hard to tolerate. Also, secrets are disclosed in public.
- Over-involved frenemy: This kind of frenemy gets involved in the friend's life in ways that the friend might not approve of. They reach out to their family, friends, or significant others in inappropriate ways without their permission to find something out. Their over-involvement often bothers and irritates the friend.
- Competitive work frenemy: This kind of frenemy is a competitor to one person. Since they work in the same place or area, they behave well, make compliments, and act as well-wishers, but in reality, they never want something good to happen to the other. They never want the other to become more successful.
- Ambivalent frenemy: This kind of frenemy has both positive and negative qualities. Sometimes, they can be helpful and polite, but sometimes, they also act in a selfish or competitive way.
- Jealous frenemy: Jealousy can turn friends into frenemies. A person may become jealous of their friends because of their raise, success, beauty, personality, humor, or social status.
- Passive-aggressive frenemy: They make mean remarks and give backhand compliments but never directly to the other's face. They can leave a person feeling confused about whether they have done something wrong.

== See also ==
- Anti-fan
- Competition
- The enemy of my enemy is my friend
- Promoting adversaries
- Love–hate relationship
