= Unholy alliance (geopolitical) =

Alliance between political antagonists

An unholy alliance popularly refers to an alliance which is perceived as unnatural, unusual, or simply undesirable, sometimes between seemingly antagonistic parties.

== Original use ==
In 1855, the term "Unholy Alliance" was used for Western European alliances with the Ottoman Empire against the interests of Russia, Greece, and most of the Balkans. It was an ironic reference to the original Holy Alliance created after the Napoleonic War in 1815 by Tsar Alexander I of Russia.

== Later use ==
In 1912, the American politician Theodore Roosevelt campaigned against the "invisible government", "the unholy alliance between corrupt business and corrupt politics".

In the context of World War II, the term has been used for the Molotov–Ribbentrop Pact between Nazi Germany and the Soviet Union, which partitioned Poland.

The term was also used by the short-lived Biafra to refer to Nigeria's allies: the United Kingdom and the Soviet Union.

The term came to be used by African nationalists to describe the predominantly-white governments of Southern Africa from 1961 to 1980: South Africa, Rhodesia, and the Portuguese Empire, all of whom were cooperating to suppress anti-colonial rebellions under their jurisdiction. For example, during the Council of Ministers of the Organization of African Unity, meeting in its Fourteenth Ordinary Session in Addis Ababa, Ethiopia, from 27 February to 6 March 1970, stated they were "Deeply concerned at the strengthening of the unholy alliance among the racist regimes of Pretoria, Salisbury, Lisbon and their collaboration with other imperialist powers". In its resolution 3151 G (XXVIII) of 14 December 1973, the UN General Assembly condemned what it termed an unholy alliance between South African apartheid and Zionism.

Takis Michas used the term for his 2002 book Unholy Alliance: Greece and Milosevic's Serbia, which describes Greek support for Serbia during the Yugoslav Wars of the 1990s.

== See also ==
- Axis of evil
- Holy Alliance
- The enemy of my enemy is my friend
- United Nations General Assembly Resolution 3379
