= Promoting adversaries =

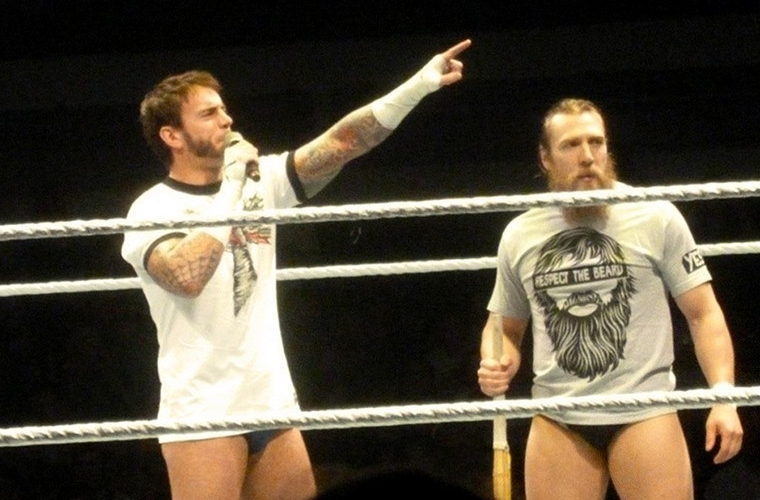
CM Punk in professional wrestling engaging in trash talk

Promoting adversaries refers to an unofficiated self-organizing tactical relationship between opposing organizations, in which both opposing sides benefit by attacking each other. The relationship typically relies on either side never fully defeating the other, because the whole time their 'conflict' helps both sides (while each side also simultaneously takes occasional 'acceptable' losses). Promoting adversaries requires neither side to be finally defeated throughout the relationship, because both sides actually prefer the relationship to continue and thus both sides to keep existing and fighting each other.

== In military, politics, and economics ==
Promoting adversaries works within a tendency where those opposed are increasingly polarized. When the tactic is used, it has the effect of making those involved in the relationship even more extreme than they were to begin with. Fundamentalist groups become more fanatical, and nations, agencies, militaries, and political parties become more repressive and authoritarian as the promotion of adversaries drags on.

It is argued by some that the modern-day guerrilla tactic of suicide bombing emerged from conditions in which one or more promoting adversaries relationships developed.

In George Orwell's book Nineteen Eighty-Four, with typical or worse than typical command-economy style technological and industrial incompetence, the three remaining superpowers left in the world use high-intensity conventional total war against each other indefinitely. What reason, if any, they have for doing so is not quite clear. It could simply be for conquest and Realpolitik in international relations. At first it appears to be for some sort of propaganda purpose, using the desperation and nationalism of the war to preserve some trace of persuasiveness of the propaganda in favor of their policies. However, that is not necessarily their actual strategy because they have deliberately made their propaganda even more utterly unconvincing than it already is; they make sure that the population is constantly exposed to obvious historical revision and introductions to Goldstein's political views for the sake of testing the population to provoke any potential dissidents into dissenting so that potential dissidents can be caught. The superpowers consider using nuclear weapons against each other's cities not for retaliation, but for conquest, but they decide to wait until they are "ready." That likely means that they do not yet consider it acceptable to finally destroy one another, perhaps because they are promoting adversaries.

== In popular culture and public relations ==
The tactic is dynamically similar to certain publicity techniques and so can be used by individuals and products seeking to gain or concentrate power or wealth as well.

Some examples include:

- Donald Trump vs. Rosie O'Donnell
- Paris Hilton vs. Nicole Richie
- Paris Hilton vs. Lindsay Lohan
- Keith Olbermann of MSNBC vs. Bill O'Reilly of Fox News
- Democratic Party vs. Republican Party in the United States

That applies aspects of manufactured conflict for ratings purposes on many television reality shows.

The promotion of adversaries has also been parodied most recently by Stephen Colbert on The Colbert Report in which Stephen's brand of Ben & Jerry's ice cream (AmeriCone Dream) is pitted against Willie Nelson's brand of Ben & Jerry's ice cream (Country Peach Cobbler). Of course, the public conflict generates advertising for both products, which are owned by the same company.

A similar concept is a frenemy.

== See also ==
- Ad hominem
- Agent provocateur
- Astroturfing
- Black propaganda
- Culture of fear
- Divide and rule
- False flag
- Front organization
- Hate speech
- Identity politics
- Irrationality
- Pork barrel
- Psychological warfare
- Red herring
- Revenge
- Salami slicing tactics
- Smear campaign
- Social undermining
- Strategy of tension
- Wedge issue
