= Dharmanomics =

2024 book by Sriram Balasubramanian

Dharmanomics: An Indigenous and Sustainable Economic Model
- First edition cover
- Author: Sriram Balasubramanian
- Language: English
- Subject: Economics
- Published: 18 November 2024
- Publisher: Bloomsbury India
- Publication place: India
- Media type: Print
- Pages: 293
- ISBN: 978-9356409699
- Preceded by: Kautilyanomics: For Modern Times

Dharmanomics: An Indigenous and Sustainable Economic Model is a 2024 book by Indian economist Sriram Balasubramanian that presents an economic framework based on the concept of Dharma as practiced in ancient India. Balasubramanian is a Senior Research Officer at the International Monetary Fund (IMF) in Washington, D.C. In this book, he follows his earlier work titled "Kautilyanomics: For Modern Times."

== Synopsis ==
Dharmanomics: An Indigenous and Sustainable Economic Model by Balasubramanian provides a coherent and structured economic framework based on the idea of Dharma spanning at least 2,500 years of Indian history. In this book, he follows his earlier work based on Kautilyan economics. This book argues that Dharma served as the central interface for economic policy in ancient India. It features elements such as Kautilyan capitalism and dharmic ecosystem driven by temples and Shreni (corporate guilds).

The work traces the historical continuity of dharma-based economics from the Saraswati Valley Civilization through various Indian dynasties, including detailed analysis of the Chola, Pallava, Vijayanagara, and Pandya dynastyies. The book examines how these ancient kingdoms structured their economies collectively to develop their regions and build monumental architectural achievements.

The framework emphasizes three key pillars: ethics and harmony, responsibilities (familial, societal, and environmental), and sustainable growth and welfare. The analysis covers economic impact of indigenous systems beyond India to examine covering its influence in regions like Cambodia and Vietnam.

== Reception ==
The book was launched in November 2024 in Çankaya University. It was recognized by Indian Prime Minister Narendra Modi and was appreciated by Finance Minister Nirmala Sitharaman and politician K. Annamalai. It was featured in the books of the year in economics for 2024 by various publications.

Policymakers and economists Sanjeev Sanyal and VK Malhotra praised the book for going beyond conventional historical narratives and exploring indigenous economic systems.

In a Moneycontrol review, NITI Aayog fellow Dr BN Gopalakrishnan quoted Swaminathan Aiyar, and criticized the book for overreliance on Madison's findings in a cherry-picking fashion to purposefully portray India's past as golden period.

== See also ==
- Arthashastra
- Indian economic history
