= Rajamandala =

Ancient Indian political term

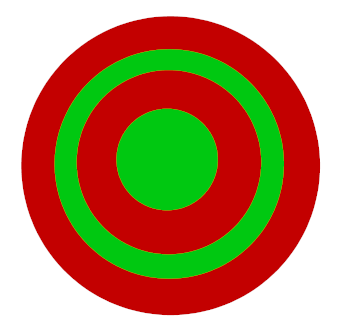
Intersecting circles of friends and enemies centered on a kingdom.

The Rajamandala (or rāja-maṇḍala lit. 'circle of kings'; raja and maṇḍala mean "king" and "circle" in Sanskrit respectively) theory, also known as the mandala theory of foreign policy or mandala theory, postulates that a neighboring state or neighbor of a natural friend is a natural enemy and that a neighbor of a natural enemy is a natural friend, resulting in alternating circles of enemies and allies centered on a given king's (raja) state.

It appears in the ancient Indian work on politics, Arthashastra (written between 4th century BCE and 2nd century CE) by Kautilya, traditionally identified with Chanakya, and the theory has been called one of Kautilya's most important postulations regarding foreign policy.

== Terminology ==
The term draws a comparison with the mandala of the Hindu and Buddhist worldview; the comparison emphasises the radiation of power from each power center, as well as the non-physical basis of the system. In particular, it postulates that a neighboring state or neighbor of a natural friend is a natural enemy and that a neighbor of a natural enemy is a natural friend, such that one can visualize a set of concentric circles emanating from any given state, with alternating circles including enemies and allies of that state respectively.

The terminology was revived two millennia later as a result of twentieth-century efforts to comprehend patterns of diffuse but coherent political power. Metaphors such as social anthropologist Tambiah's idea of a "galactic polity", describe such political patterns as the mandala. Historian Victor Lieberman preferred the metaphor of a "solar polity," as in the Solar System, where there is one central body, the Sun, and the components or planets of the Solar System. The "Rajamandala" concept of ancient India was the prototype for the Mandala model of South East Asian political systems in later centuries, established by British historian O. W. Wolters.

== See also ==
- Mandala (political model)
- Indian political philosophy
- Chakravarti (Sanskrit term)
- Greater India
- Indosphere
- Geopolitics
- History of Indian foreign relations
- The enemy of my enemy is my friend

== Bibliography ==
- King, Governance, and Law in Ancient India: Kauṭilya's Arthaśāstra, translated and annotated by Patrick Olivelle, Oxford University Press, 2013
- M. B. Chande (2004), Kautilyan Arthasastra, Atlantic, ISBN 81-7156-733-9, especially Book Six: Circle of Kings as the Basis, pp. 305–312
- John Keay (2000), India: A History, HarperCollins, pp. 170–172
- Hermann Kulke; Dietmar Rothermund (2004), A History of India (fourth ed.), Routledge
- Vikas Kumar (2010), "Strategy in the Kautilya Arthasastra", Homo Oeconomicus, 27 (2): 289–320
- Mahendra Prasad Singh (2011), "Kautilya: Theory of State", Indian Political Thought: Themes and Thinkers, Pearson, pp. 1–17, ISBN 978-81-317-5851-9
