= Oriental Research Institute Mysore =

Research institute in Mysore, India

Oriental Research Institute, Mysore
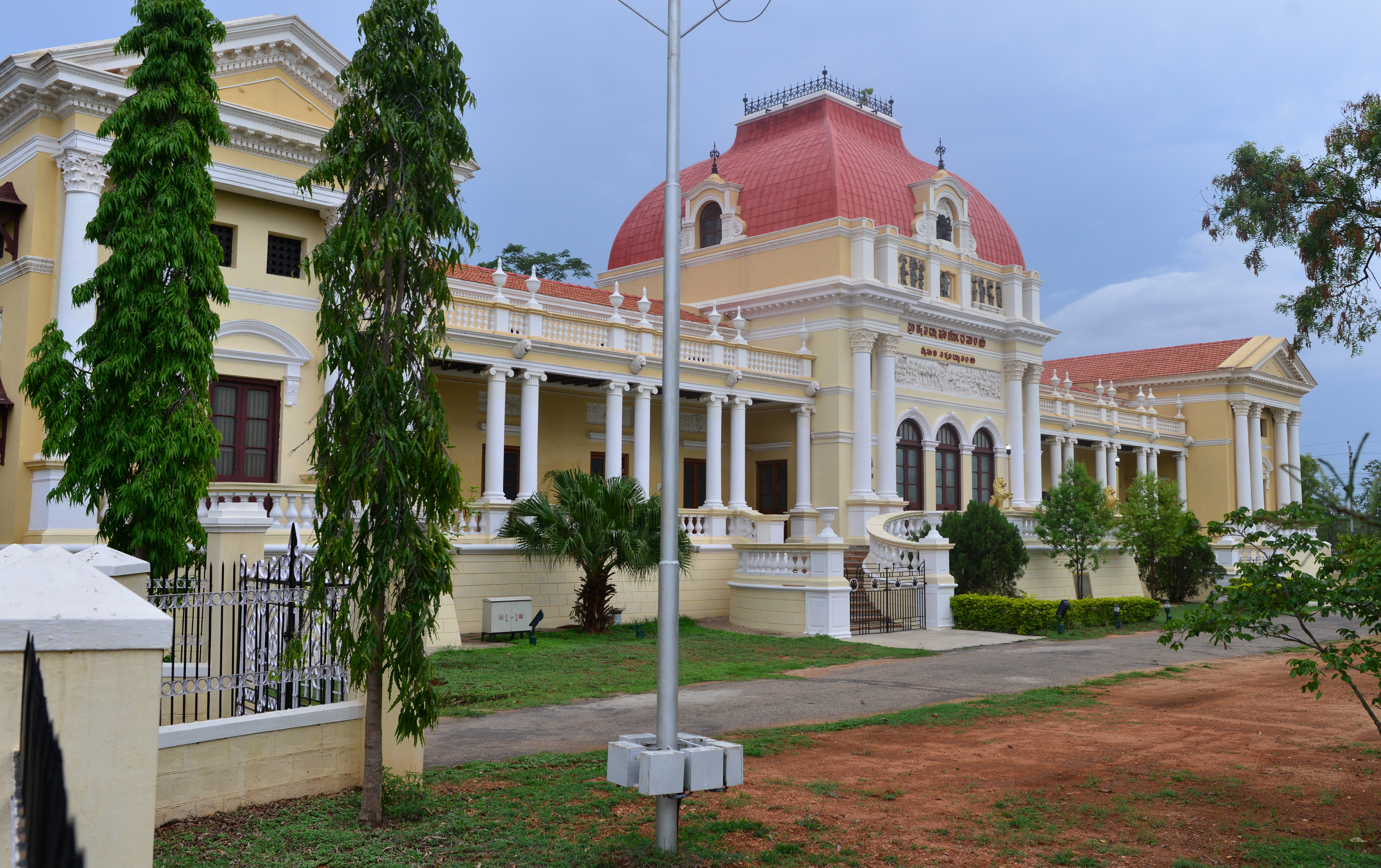
- Oriental Research Institute front facade
- Established: 1891
- Type: National library
- Location: Krishnaraja Boulevard, Mysore
- Coordinates: 12°18′23.07″N 76°38′24.5″E
- Patron: Chamarajendra Wadiyar X
- Formerly called: Government Oriental Library, Mysore

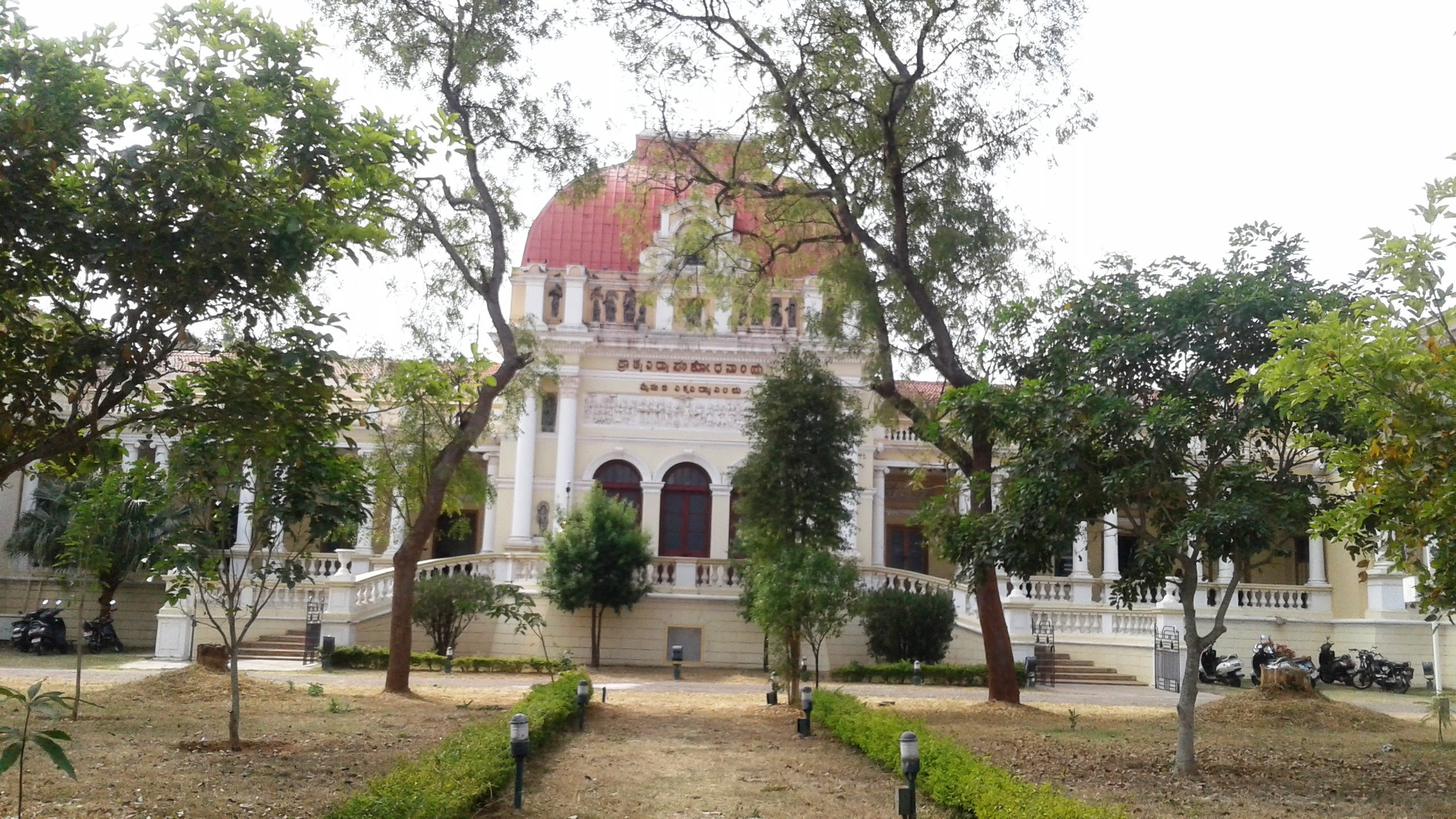
Front view

The Oriental Research Institute (ORI), formerly known as the Government Oriental Library, is a research institute at Mysore, India, which collects, exhibits, edits, and publishes rare manuscripts written in various scripts like, Brahmic (Sanskrit, Kannada), (Nandinagari), Devanagari (Sanskrit), Grantha, Malayalam, Tigalari, etc.

The Government Oriental Library was started in 1891 under the patronage of Maharaja Chamarajendra Wadiyar X. It is located at the northern end of Krishnaraja Boulevard (adjacently opposite to Mysore University's Crawford Hall), in the architecturally attractive Jubilee Hall built in 1887 to commemorate the golden jubilee of Queen Victoria's accession to the British throne. It was a part of the Department of Education until 1916, in which year it became part of the newly established University of Mysore. The Oriental Library was renamed as the Oriental Research Institute in 1943.

== Work ==
From the year 1893 to date the ORI has published nearly two hundred titles. The library features rare collections such as the Encyclopaedia of Religion and Ethics by James Hastings, A Vedic Concordance by Maurice Bloomfield, and critical editions of the Ramayana and Mahabharata. It was the first public library in Mysore city for research and editing of manuscripts. The prime focus was on Indology. The institute publishes an annual journal called Mysore Orientalist. Its most famous publications include Kautilya's Arthashastra, written in the 4th century BC, edited by Dr. R. Shamashastri, which brought international fame to the institute when published in 1909.

One day a man from Tanjore handed over a manuscript of Arthashastra written on dried palm leaves to Dr Rudrapatnam Shamashastry, the librarian of Mysore Government Oriental Library now ORI. Shamashastry's job was to look after the library's ancient manuscripts. He had never seen anything like these palm leaves before. Here was a book that would revolutionise the knowledge of India's great past. This palm leaf manuscript is preserved in the library, now named Oriental Research Institute. The pages of the book are filled with 1500-year-old Grantha script. It looks like as if they have been printed but the words have been inscribed by hand. Other copies of Arthashastra were later discovered later in other parts of India.

In this context, my mind remembering a day which was the His Excellency Krishnaraja Wodeyar went to Germany at the time of Dr. R. Shamashastry were working as a curator of Oriental Library, Mysore, The King sat in a meeting held in Germany and introduced himself as the King of Mysore State. Immediately a man stood up and asked, "Are you from our Dr. R. Shamashastry's Mysore?" Because the Arthashastra edited by him took a fame worldwide. The King wondered and came back to Mysore immediately to see Dr. R. Shamashastry, and also Dr. R. Shamashastry appointed as Asthana Vidwan. Sritattvanidhi, is a compilation of slokas by Krishnaraja Wodeyar III. Three edited manuscripts Navaratnamani-mahatmyam (a work on gemology), Tantrasara-sangraha (a work on sculptures and architecture), and Vaidashastra-dipika (an ayurvedic text), Rasa-kaumudi (on mercurial medicine)all of them with English and Kannada translation, are already in advanced stages of printing.

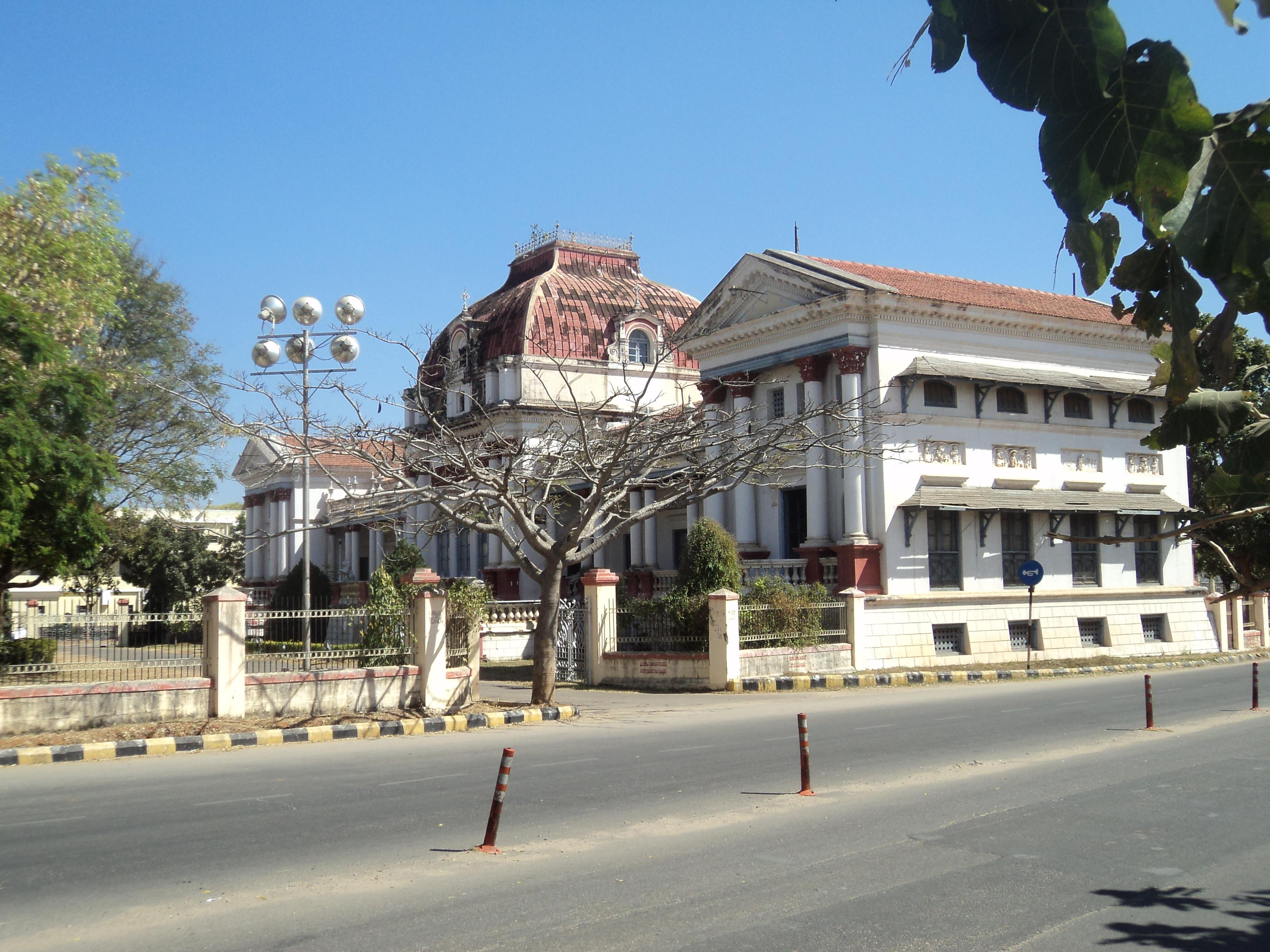
Oriental Research Institute

The ORI houses over 45,000 Palm leaf manuscript bundles and the 75,000 works on those leaves. The manuscripts are palm leaves cut to a standard size of 150 by 35 mm (5.9 by 1.4 in). Brittle palm leaves are sometimes softened by scrubbing a paste made of ragi and then used by the ancients for writing, similar to the use of papyrus in ancient Egypt. Manuscripts are organic materials that run the risk of decay and are prone to be destroyed by silverfish. To preserve them the ORI applies lemon grass oil on the manuscripts which acts like a pesticide. The lemon grass oil also injects natural fluidity into the brittle palm leaves and the hydrophobic nature of the oil keeps the manuscripts dry so that the text is not lost to decay due to humidity.

The conventional method followed at the ORI was to preserve manuscripts by capturing them in microfilm, which then necessitated the use of a microfilm reader for viewing or studying. Once the ORI has digitized the manuscripts, the text can be viewed and manipulated by a computer. Software is then used to put together disjointed pieces of manuscripts and to correct or fill in any missing text. In this manner, the manuscripts are restored and enhanced. The original palm leaf manuscripts are also on reference at the ORI for those interested.

== Notable researchers ==
- A.R. Krishnashastry
- Dr. R. Shamasastry

== In literature ==
The Oriental Research Institute is featured in the 2014 mystery thriller novel The Emperor's Riddles by Satyarth Nayak.

== See also ==
- List of Heritage Buildings in Mysore
- Krishnaraja Boulevard
- Maharajas College
- Crawford Hall
