= Arthashastra =

Ancient Indian treatise

Kautilya's Arthashastra
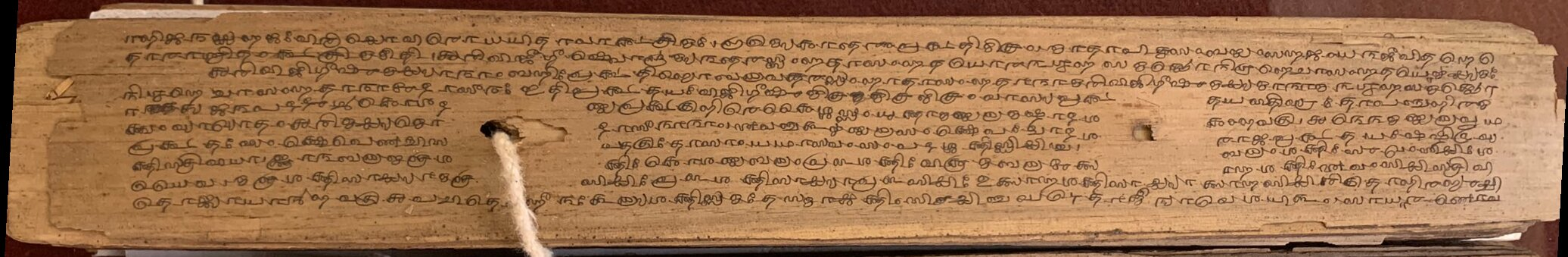
- 16th century Arthashastra manuscript in Grantha script kept at the Oriental Research Institute, Mysore

Information
- Religion: Hinduism
- Author: multiple authors; (Note: Dating and authorship: Rao & Subrahmanyam (2013): "The confident initial assertion that the text’s author was 'the famous Brahman Kautilya, also named Vishnugupta, and known from other sources by the patronymic Chanakya', and that the text was written at the time of the foundation of the Maurya dynasty, has of course been considerably eroded over the course of the twentieth century."; Keith (1916), Jolly (1920s), Winternitz (1924), Johsnston (1929): Burrow (1968, p. 17): "Ever since the first publication of the Arthasästra in 1909 a lively controversy has been in progress concerning its authenticity and date. According to one view, that of its first editor and of many other distinguished scholars, the treatise is the work of Kautilya, alias Cãnakya, alias Visnugupta, the minister of Candragupta, founder of the Maurya dynasty. According to this view the work can be precisely dated at the close of the fourth century B. C. Other authorities, among them Jolly, Keith and Winternitz, have argued that this early dating is impossible, and various arguments have been advanced to show that the work must be dated well after the Christian era. A date somewhere about 300 A. D. represents the general consensus of this school on the subject."; Bhandarkar (1926, p. 67): "Soon after the Arthašāstra of Kautalya was published, it came to be more assiduously studied in Europe than even in India; and a view of diametrically opposite character was being formulated, namely, that the work belonged not to the fourth century B. C. but to the fourth century A. D. This is now the view which is generally held by European Sanskritists, and the late Sir Ramkrishna Bhandarkar iś perhaps the only Indian scholar who has expressed a similar opinion. The arguments on which this view is based were marshalled and enunciated by Prof. Jolly and Prof. Winternitz [1924], and were briefly indicated in a short but lucid note by Prof. Keith [1916]."; Kane (1926, p. 87): "Keith [1916] and Winternitz hold that the extant Kautiliya is not the work of the Maurya minister."; Burrow (1968, p. 21) refers to Johnston (1929, JRAS, p.88): "E. H. Johnston, who accepts the tradition that Visnugupta Kautilya was the author of the Arthasãstra and at the same time takes the view, which he considers to be unavoidable, that "he was a different person from the minister of Candragupta Maurya, for whose name and story legend is our only authority."; Kangle (1965, p.106), quoted in Olivelle (2013, p. 25), echoing Kane (1926): "We may, therefore, conclude that there is no convincing reason why this work should not be regarded as the work of Kauṭilya, who helped Candragupta to come to power in Magadha."; Schlingloff (1967), translated in Schlingloff (2012, p. 15): "The traditional attribution to the minister Kautilya [Chanakya] is hardly historical, and the compendium probably arose in the first half of the first millennium AD."; Hartmut Scharfe argued in 1968 that "the extant Arthaśāstra is the prose expansion of an earlier verse original" (McClish 2009, p. 5). dating it to c. 150 CE (Petrocchi 2017, p. 480). Olivelle (2013, pp. 25–26, plus note 49): "Scharfe (1993, 66) has also argued that the “use of vacana ʻgrammatical numberʼ affirms that the tractate was composed not only after Pāṇini but also after Kātyāyana,” that is, after the third century B.C.E."; Trautmann (1971) contrary to the view that Chanakya refers to the birthplace, Trautmann explains that Kautilya and Chanakya are both Gotra-names, which "makes it clear that we are dealing with two distinct persons, the minister Cāṇakya of legend and Kauṭilya the compiler of the Arthashastra": Bhandarkar (1926, p. 69): "Samkararya has said about it in his commentary on Kāmandaka's Nitisūra. "Visņugupta" says the commentator, "is the name given at the naming ceremony and Cânakya and Kautilya are connected with the birth-place and the gotra respectively.""; Trautmann (1971, p. 10): "while in his character as author of an arthaśāstra he is generally referred to by his gotra name, Kauṭilya"; Trautmann (1971, p. 67), referring to Burrow (1968): "T. Burrow ("Cāṇakya and Kauṭalya", Annals of the Bhandarkar Oriental Research Institute 48–49, 1968, pp. 17 ff.) has now shown that Cāṇakya is also a gotra name, which in conjunction with other evidence makes it clear that we are dealing with two distinct persons, the minister Cāṇakya of legend and Kauṭilya the compiler of the Arthashastra. Furthermore, this throws the balance of evidence in favor of the view that the second name was originally spelt Kauṭalya, and that after the compiler of the Arth came to be identified with the Mauryan minister, it was altered to Kauṭilya (as it appears in Āryaśūra, Viśākhadatta and Bāna) for the sake of the pun. We must then assume that the later spelling subsequently replaced the earlier in the gotra lists and elsewhere.'"; Rangarajan (1992, p. 22 (electr. edit., flat page-count)), reprint of 1987: "Those who question the ascription of the 4th century B.C. as the date of the work place it not later than 150 A.D. Establishing a convincing date is, no doubt, important to scholars. However, Kautilya’s greatness is in no way diminished if we choose any date between 1850 and 2300 years ago."; Hansen (2012, p. 47), referring to Trautman (1971): "...in the Arthashastra. This text, while it may be based on earlier texts, dates to the second to fourth centuries CE. Attributed to Kautilya, the Arthashastra is a prescriptive text packed full of instructions about how to govern."; Olivelle (2013): Olivelle (2013, pp. 25–26, plus note 49):"This dating of the AŚ [to the Maurya period] has been refuted by numerous scholars" [note 49:] "See, for example, Trautmann 1971; Scharfe 1993; McClish 2009."; Olivelle (2013, p. 31) "Just as with the dates, with regard to authorship we also have to speak in the plural; the AŚ as we have it has multiple authors corresponding to the three phases of its composition. Beyond that, we should also inquire about the early history of its reception, especially the ascription of the AŚ to Canakya and to Visnugupta."; Olivelle (2013, p. 25): "Given its compositional history outlined above, the very question regarding the date or the author of the Arthaśastra becomes moot. We have to instead seek dates and authors in the plural."; Olivelle (2013, p. 29): "Given that the composition of the AŚ proper begins with this recension, we can conclude, with some confidence that Kautilya composed his treatise sometime between 50 and 125 C.E.; Olivelle (2013, p. 30): "If we allow at least a few decades for this new edition of the AŚ to reach a wider audience and to gain renown, then we can place the upper limit, the terminus ante quem, of the Śastric Redaction to around 300 C.E. or perhaps a bit earlier. This we should not be too far off the mark in dating the redaction to 175–300 C.E.; Coningham & Young (2015, p. 451): "However, there are issues with a number of the key sources recording the Mauryan world as exemplified by the work of Thomas Trautmann, who undertook a statistical analysis of the Arthashastra and concluded that it had not been written by a single author but that it comprised sections from a number of sources and authors. Stating that parts included those of "previous teachers whose works, in condensed form perhaps were bound into a single work by a compiler who divided the work into chapters, added the terminal verses, composed the first and last chapters", Trautmann concluded that "[w]e can say with confidence that Kautilya cannot have been the author of the Arthashastra as a whole" (1971: 174-175). Attributed by Trautmann to a date of the second century CE (1971: 177), Basham commented in Trautmann's preface that "No a historian the results may appear at first destructive. But the edifice which successive generations of Indian historians have built rests on very shaky foundations" (Basham 1971: xi)."; Upinder Singh changed het stance: Singh (2008): "There do not yet seem to be sufficient grounds to abandon the idea that some part of the text was composed in the Maurya period by a person named Kautilya, allowing for later interpolations stretching into the early centuries CE."; Singh (2017), Political Violence in Ancient India, Harvard University Press, p. 98: "Patrick Olivelle has suggested that while the prehistory of the work may go back to the mid-first century BCE, the first major redaction was composed between circa 50 and 125 CE, and the second one between circa 175 and 300 CE. In view of the continuing debate over its age, it is best to treat the Arthashatra as a text whose composition ranged over several centuries, before and after the turn of the millennium. ... When I refer to "Kautilya," I use the name as a short-hand for the various authors (including, probably, one named Kautilya) who must have contributed to creating the text that has come down to us."; Singh (2021), Ancient India: Culture of Contradictions, Chapter 1: "Kautilya’s Arthashastra is a brilliant treatise on statecraft which discusses how a king can acquire, maintain, and enhance his power. At one time, it was thought to belong to the Maurya period, but recent research suggests a later period of composition, between c. 50 and 300 CE."; McClish (2019, pp. 152–153): "Sometime around the first century BCE, an unknown expert on government drew together a number of disparate sources pertaining to statecraft, added some of his own material, and forged them into a comprehensive treatise. I refer to this text as the Dandanīti [...] Not long after, perhaps in the third century CE, an individual who called himself “Kautilya” redacted the Dandanīti. Kautilya added a great deal of new material, recast the text in the ideological image of the dharma literature, and renamed it the Arthaśāstra of Kautilya."; Marika Vicziany, Jayant Bhalchandra Bapat (2024), South Asian Goddesses and the Natural Environment, p.8, writing about a post-Mauryan dating with Gupta-influences, quoting Trautman (2015): "This rough estimate of the date of the Arthashastra is broadly agreed on despite debates about its precise composition.") main compiler or redactor Kautilya, also known as Vishnugupta and Chanakya, as later additions and traditions also mention Vishnugupta and Chanakya.
- Language: Sanskrit
- Period: 1st-3rd century ce; traditional dating 3rd century BCE

Full text
- Arthashastra at English Wikisource

Kautilya's Arthashastra (IAST: Kauṭilyam Arthaśāstram; transl. Kautilya's compendium on worldly affairs) is an Ancient Indian Sanskrit treatise on statecraft, politics, economic policy and military strategy. (Note: Arthashastra: Boesche (2002, p. 7): "... is classically expressed in Indian literature in the Arthashastra of Kautilya."; Siva Kumar & Rao (1996): "The paper develops value based management guidelines from the famous Indian treatise on management, Kautilya's Arthashastra.) The text is likely the work of several authors over centuries, starting as a compilation of Arthashastras, texts which according to Olivelle date from the 2nd c. BCE to the 1st c. CE. These earlier treatises were compiled and amended in a new treatise, according to McClish and Olivelle in the 1st century CE by either an anonymous author or Kautilya, though earlier and later dates have also been proposed. While often regarded as created by a single author, McClish and Olivelle argue that this compilation, possibly titled Daņdanīti, served as the basis for a major expansion and redaction in the 2nd or 3rd century CE by either Kautilya or an anonymous author, when several books, dialogical comments, and the disharmonious chapter-division were added, (Note: McClish (2009, pp. 142–143) additions: all chapter colophons; the chapter end verses; all citations of Kautilya or other teachers; the first chapter (KAS 1.1); the last chapter (15.1); parts of book 1, 2, 3, 4, 5, 7, 9, 10; complete books 8, 11, 12, 14, 15) and a stronger Brahmanical ideology was brought in. The text thus became a proper arthashastra, and was retitled to Kautilya's Arthashastra.

Two names for the text's compilor or redactor are used in the text, Kauṭalya (Kautilya) and Vishnugupta. Chanakya (375–283 BCE), the legendary counsellor of Chandragupta Maurya, is implied in a later interpolation, reinforced by Gupta-era and medieval traditions, which explicitly identified Kautilya with Chanakya. This identification started during the Gupta reign (c. 240 – c. 579), strengthening the Gupta's ideological presentation as heirs of the Mauryas. However, the identification has been questioned by scholarship, and rejected by the main studies on the topic since 1965, because of stylistic differences within the text which point to multiple authorship, as well as historical elements which are anachronistic for the Mauryan period, but fit in the first centuries of the Common Era. (Note: Olivelle (2013, p. 26): "It is impossible for the prime minister of Candragupta to have tolerated such defenses if he was the same person who authored the AŚ. Clearly, the defenses in older cities were made of wood, as the use of sāla (a kind of tree) as a common term for defensive walls in later literature including the AŚ (2.4.16 n.) indicates. At some point, however, stone and brick became the norm, as at Kauśambhī (Schlinglo 1967, 48f; 1969, 13). The data on the construction of forts in the AŚ (2.3), therefore, must come from a period later than the Maurya.") The Arthashastra was influential until the 12th century, when it disappeared. It was rediscovered in 1905 by R. Shamasastry, who published it in 1909. The first English translation, also by Shamasastry, was published in 1915.

The Sanskrit title, Arthashastra, can be translated as 'treatise on "political science"' or "economic science" or simply "statecraft", (Note: Olivelle (2013, pp. 14, 330): "The title Arthaśāstra is found only in the colophons, in three verses 5.6.47, 7.10.38 and 7.18.42", (page 14) and "Prosperity and decline, stability and weakening, and vanquishing — knowing the science of politics [अर्थशास्त्र, arthaśāstra], he should employ all of these strategies." (page 330)) as the word artha (अर्थ) is polysemous in Sanskrit; the word has a broad scope. It includes books on the nature of government, law, civil and criminal court systems, ethics, economics, markets and trade, the methods for screening ministers, diplomacy, theories on war, nature of peace, and the duties and obligations of a king. The text incorporates Hindu philosophy, includes ancient economic and cultural details on agriculture, mineralogy, mining and metals, animal husbandry, medicine, forests and wildlife.

The Arthashastra explores issues of social welfare, the collective ethics that hold a society together, advising the king that in times and in areas devastated by famine, epidemic and such acts of nature, or by war, he should initiate public projects such as creating irrigation waterways and building forts around major strategic holdings and towns and exempt taxes on those affected. The text was influenced by Hindu texts such as the sections on kings, governance and legal procedures included in Manusmriti.

== Structure, dating, and authorship ==
The authorship and date of writing are unknown, and there is evidence that the surviving manuscripts are not original, and are based on texts which were modified and edited in their history, but were most likely completed in the available form between the 1st and 3rd century CE. Olivelle states that the surviving manuscripts of the Arthashastra are the product of a transmission that has involved at least three major overlapping divisions or layers, which together consist of 15 books, 150 chapters and 180 topics.

=== History of the manuscripts ===
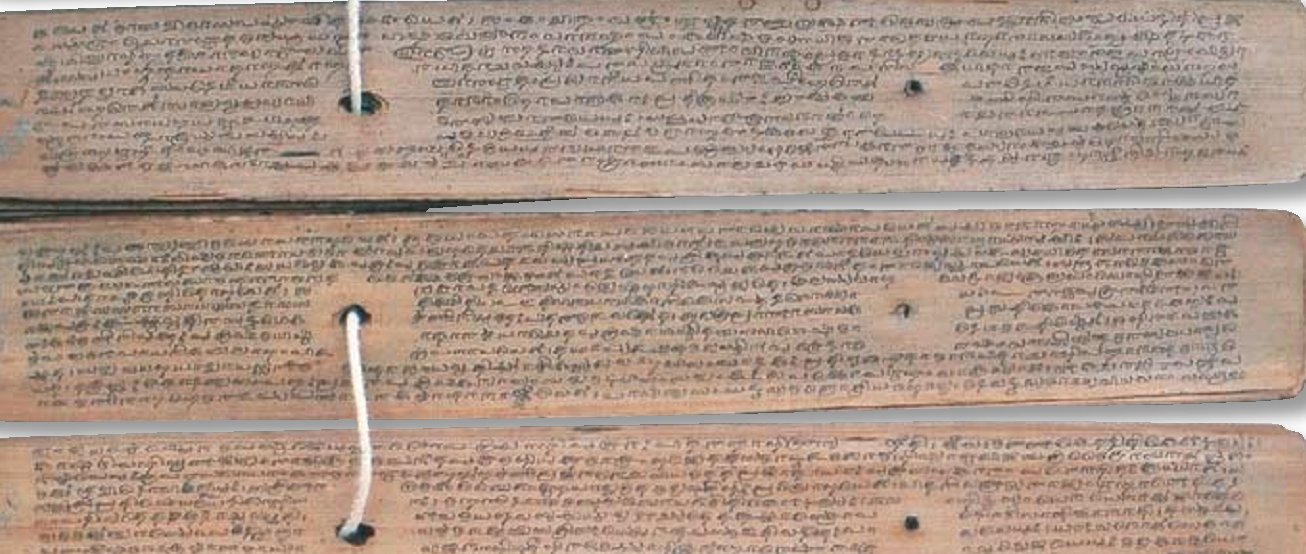
Rediscovered c. 16th century Arthashastra manuscript in Grantha script from the Oriental Research Institute (ORI) which was found in 1905

The Arthasastra is mentioned and dozens of its verses have been found on fragments of manuscript treatises buried in ancient Buddhist monasteries of northwest China, Afghanistan and northwest Pakistan. This includes the Spitzer Manuscript (c. 200 CE) discovered near Kizil in China and the birch bark scrolls now a part of the Bajaur Collection (1st to 2nd century CE) discovered in the ruins of a Khyber Pakhtunkhwa Buddhist site in 1999, state Harry Falk and Ingo Strauch.

The text was considered lost by colonial era scholars, until a manuscript was discovered in 1905. A copy of the Arthashastra in Sanskrit, written on palm leaves, was presented by a Tamil Brahmin from Thanjavur to the newly opened Mysore Oriental Library headed by Benjamin Lewis Rice. The text was identified by the librarian Rudrapatna Shamasastry as the Arthashastra. During 1905–1909, Shamasastry published English translations of the text in installments, in journals Indian Antiquary and Mysore Review.

During 1923–1924, Julius Jolly and Richard Schmidt published a new edition of the text, which was based on a Malayalam script manuscript in the Bavarian State Library. In the 1950s, fragmented sections of a north Indian version of Arthashastra were discovered in form of a Devanagari manuscript in a Jain library in Patan, Gujarat. A new edition based on this manuscript was published by Muni Jina Vijay in 1959. In 1960, R. P. Kangle published a critical edition of the text, based on all the available manuscripts. Numerous translations and interpretations of the text have been published since then.

The text written in 1st millennium BCE Sanskrit, which is coded, dense and capable of many interpretations, especially as English and Sanskrit are very different languages, both grammatically and syntactically. Patrick Olivelle, whose translation was published in 2013 by Oxford University Press, said it was the "most difficult translation project I have ever undertaken." Parts of the text are still opaque after a century of modern scholarship.

=== Translation of the title ===
Different scholars have translated the word "arthashastra" in different ways.

- R.P. Kangle: "Artha is the sustenance or livelihood of men, and Arthaśāstra is the science of the means to Artha" "science of politics";
- A.L. Basham: a "treatise on polity"
- D.D. Kosambi: "science of material gain"
- G.P. Singh: "science of polity"
- Roger Boesche: "science of political economy"
- Patrick Olivelle: "science of politics"

Artha (prosperity, wealth, purpose, meaning, economic security) is one of the four aims of human life (puruṣārtha) in Hinduism, the others being dharma (laws, duties, rights, virtues, right way of living), kama (pleasure, emotions, sex) and moksha (spiritual liberation). Śāstra is the Sanskrit word for "rules" or "science".

=== Structure ===
The first chapter of the first book is a table of contents, while the last chapter of the last book is a short 73 verse epilogue asserting that all thirty-two Yukti–elements of correct reasoning methods were deployed to create the text; both were probably later added to the original text.

Avoid War

One can lose a war as easily as one can win.
War is inherently unpredictable.
War is also expensive. Avoid war.
Try Upaya (four strategies).
Then Sadgunya (six forms of non-war pressure).
Understand the opponent and seek to outwit him.
When everything fails, resort to military force.

— Arthashastra Books 2.10, 6-7, 10

A notable structure of the treatise is that while all chapters are primarily prose, each transitions into a poetic verse towards its end, as a marker, a style that is found in many ancient Hindu Sanskrit texts where the changing poetic meter or style of writing is used as a syntax code to silently signal that the chapter or section is ending. All 150 chapters of the text also end with a colophon stating the title of the book it belongs in, the topics contained in that book (like an index), the total number of titles in the book and the books in the text. Finally, the Arthashastra text numbers it 180 topics consecutively, and does not restart from one when a new chapter or a new book starts. The topics are unevenly divided over the chapters, with some chapters containing multiple topics, and some topics spread over multiple chapters; a peculiarity which betrays extensive redaction, with the division into chapters as a later addition, as argued by Winternitz, Keith, Trautmann, McClish, and Olivelle.

The division into 15, 150, and 180 of books, chapters and topics respectively was probably not accidental, states Olivelle, because ancient authors of major Hindu texts favor certain numbers, such as 18 Parvas in the epic Mahabharata. The largest book is the second, with 1,285 sentences, while the smallest is eleventh, with 56 sentences. The entire book has about 5,300 sentences on politics, governance, welfare, economics, protecting key officials and king, gathering intelligence about hostile states, forming strategic alliances, and conduct of war, exclusive of its table of contents and the last epilogue-style book.

=== Translations and scholarship ===
The text has been translated and interpreted by Shamashastry (translation, 1909), R.P. Kangle (translation 1969, (Note: Olivelle (2013, pp. xv–xvii) states that the Kangle edition has problems as it incorrectly relied on a mistaken text as commentary; he has emended the corrections in his 2013 translation.) textual analysis 1965), Dieter Schlingloff (historical background, 1965, 1967, and 1969 (Note: Schlingloff (2012) contains translations of Schlingloff (1967) and Schlingloff (1969))), Scharfe (textual analysis, 1968), Trautmann (textual analysis, 1971), Rangarajan (translation, 1992), Patrick Olivelle (textual analysis 2004, translation 2013), and McClish (textual analysis 2009, 2014, 2019), and a selection of Arthashastra-texts by Olivelle and McClish (2012).

According to McClish, writing in 2009, three "major recent studies" have been done on the composition of the Arthashastra, namely Kangle (1965), Scharfe (1968), and Trautmann (1971), whereafter "little, if any, major work has been done on the composition of the Arthaśāstra in nearly forty years." Olivelle published King, Governance, and Law in Ancient India: Kauṭilya's Arthaśāstra in 2013, "taking into account the latest advances in Kautilya studies"; a translation which, according to Richard Davis, "clearly supplants all other translations of this work into English, including those of Kangle (1977) and L. N. Rangarajan (1992)." (Note: Olivelle's translation: Davis (2015): "This new translation clearly supplants all other translations of this work into English, including those of Kangle (1977) and L. N. Rangarajan (1992). For many years, those of us who teach the Arthaśāstra in our classes have had to make do with these adequate but unsatisfactory translations."; Mukherjee (2017): "Patrick Olivelle's King, Governance, and Law in Ancient India: Kautilya's Arthasastra is a tour de force. It is not yet another translation of the classic, but a translation enriched with annotations by one of the most eminent scholars in the field. The 'Note to the Translation' (pp. xv-xix), thus, could not have been more succinct, and yet useful, and the Introduction (pp. 1-60) more comprehensive."; Langlois-Berthelot (2013): "As a student of Sanskrit literature, it is difficult not to know Patrick Olivelle. He is probably one of the most remarkable scholars in this field.") Olivelle adds Dieter Schlingloff's studies (1965, 1967, and 1969) and McClish' 2009 PhD-thesis as "groundbreaking studies" since Kangle's study from 1965; McClish' also published in 2019 The History of the Arthasastra.

=== Dating, chronology and layers of the text ===
==== Single or multiple authorship ====
Olivelle (2013) notes that there are two issues with regard to its composition: if it was an entirely original work, and if the present text "is the result of emendations and redactions of the author's original work." The first is uncontroversial, as the Arthashastra itself states at its start that it has been composed by drawing together Arthashastras from former teachers. Regarding the second issue, Olivelle notes that even those who argue for a single authorship, agree that the text contains interpolations and glosses; the real issue is if there were one or more major redactions of the original text.

While Kangle stated that "[i]t is not possible to point out any substantial parts of the present work as belonging to a later age or as the work of a later hand," early on philologists and text critics have proposed that the Arthashastra consisted of multiple layers of redaction. (Note: McClish (2009, p. 4): "However, since shortly after the editio princeps was published by Shamasastry, many philologists and text critics have argued that certain features of the Arthaśāstra suggest for it composition through successive redactions or by an individual much later than the legendary Kautilya [Charnakya].1" In note 1, McClish mentions "Winternitz (1998 [1963 trans.; 1920 German ed.]), Stein (1921), Jolly (1923), Nag (1923), Keith (1996 [1928]), Scharfe (1993 2nd ed.; 1968 German ed.]), Trautmann (1971), Witzel (2006), etc.") Stylistic differences within some sections of the surviving manuscripts suggest that it likely includes the work of several authors over the centuries. There is also no doubt, states Olivelle, that "revisions, errors, additions and perhaps even subtractions have occurred" in Arthashastra since its final redaction in 300 CE or earlier. McClish:

Specific features, such as the text’s dual division into prakaranas and adhyāyas, the logical disjunction generated by the occurrence of Kautilya’s direct speech in his own text, shifts in style, and the general breadth of the work suggested a more complex compositional process.

To this, Trautmann and Olivelle add the diverse vocabularies used within the Arthashastra.

==== Overview of scholarly treatments ====
According to Kangle (1965), echoing Kane (1926), after judging the arguments against the attribution to Chanakya: "there is no convincing reason why this work should not be regarded as the work of Kauṭilya, who helped Chandragupta to come to power in Magadha." (Note: Kangle (1965, p. 106), quoted in Olivelle (2013, p. 25))

Schlingloff (1967) argued that, "The traditional attribution to the minister Kautilya [Chanakya] is hardly historical, and the compendium probably arose in the first half of the first millennium AD." (Note: Schlingloff (2012, p. 15), translation of Schlingloff (1967))

Hartmut Scharfe (1968) argued that "the extant Arthaśāstra is the prose expansion of an earlier verse original," dating it to c. 150 CE.

Trautmann (1971) conducted a statistical analysis of words used in the text, concluding that the Arthashastra is a composite work containing the work of multiple authors: "[i]t being shown that the Arthashastra has not one author but several, it follows that it is to be referred to not one date but to as many dates as it has authors." According to Trautmann, approved by Olivelle, the division into chapters, AS 1.1 with its table of contents, and book fifteen, are the work of "a later, tidying and organizing hand, reworking a text already divided by books and topics, and already possessing an adequate introduction in Arthasastra1.2.

Trautmann "provisionally" proposes 250 CE as the date for the compilation of the Arthashastra, pointing to a number of historical elements which make an earlier dating impossible. (Note: Trautmann's arguments for an early CE dating: Trautmann (1971, p. 175) notes that one of the earliest texts referring to the Arthashastra, the Pancatantra, uses the word dīnāra a Roman coin not used in India before the Common Era.; Trautmann (1971, p. 176): Book II chapter 10 of the Arthashastra itself refers to the use of Sanskrit in royal edicts, which began in 150 CE, setting an earliest date for the text.; Trautmann (1971, p. 176): Chapter 12 mentions punched-marked coins, which disappeared at the end of the second century, setting the latest possible date for that text.; Trautmann (1971, p. 177) further notes that Book II refers to Chinese silk, cīnapatta (cīnabhūmija), which started to be exported to India after the Qin dynasty (221-206 BCE) gained power in China.; Trautmann (1971, p. 178) also refers to an argument set forward by Sylvain Lévi already in 1936, who noted that Book II 11.42 mentions coral (pravālaka) coming from Alexandria, Egypt, which was highly appreciated by the Indians. This can't be dated earlier than the time of Augustus (63 BCE - 14 CE), "when direct sea-going commerce began in earnest." This is further corroborated by the fact that "Sanskrit words for coral (pravāla, vidruma) [...] first appear in texts of the Christian era to which the Arthasdstra therefore belongs," to which Trautmann adds "I might add that the same is true of words for silk (kauśeya, çinapațța)."; Trautmann (1971, p. 178): also, as noted by Hemachandra Raychaudhuri in 1919, gems and aloe from Ceylon are described as pārasamudraka, "from Simhala"; were the text from Mauryan times, it would have used Tamraparni for Ceylon, not Parasamudra.) (Note: Trautmann (1971, p. 177) further notes that "it is likely that Book 2 is of northern provenance: it tells us that the shadow of the gnomon disappears at midday of the summer solstice, a condition which is only fulfilled along the Tropic of Capricorn, e.g. in Sindh, Malwa, Magadha and Bengal (2.20.41-2 and note). For the North the arguments in combination suggest a date within the second century A.D., conceivably somewhat earlier, but scarcely later than the third century.")

Rangarajan (1987), who re-translated the Arthashastra, states in his Introduction that "some scholars have expressed doubt about the authorship of what we now know as Kautilya's Arthashastra and the date of its composition." Regarding the question of multiple authorship, Rangarajan questions Trautman's analysis, pointing to a "uniformity in style" and approvingly citing Kangle that "there is no convincing reason why this work should not be regarded as the work of Kautilya who helped Chandragupta to come to power in Magadha." Yet, Rangarajan also refers to a dating of 150 CE, stating that " Kautilya's greatness is in no way diminished if we choose any date between 1850 and 2300 years ago."

Rangarajan notes that the science of artha (material well-being, livelihood, economically productive activity, wealth) was not developed by Kautilya, but drew from older works that are all lost, and "Kautilya's is the earliest text that has come down to us." One possible reason for the disappearance of these earlier literature on Arthashatra could be the Kautilya's comprehensive treatise that made those works redundant, a possibility also mentioned by Olivelle (2013).

According to Olivelle (2013), the initial text had one major revision, and possibly several minor revisions. Olivelle concludes that the oldest layer of text, the "sources of the Kauṭilya", dates from the period 150 BCE – 50 CE, consisting of separate treatises from separate authors, (Note: With book 2 possibly combining two different treatises into one book.) confirming Trautmann's analysis. The "Kauṭilya Recension" was created in the period 50–125 CE by a historic person named Kautilya, compiling selections from these texts into a new shastra, which was likely titled Daņdanīti, "literally the administration of punishment but more broadly the exercise of governance." By the time of Manu (mid 2nd century) this recension had gained popularity and authority, as it was this recension which was used by Manu. (Note: Manu: * Olivelle (2013, pp. 23–24): "It appears that Manu, in composing chapters 7-9 of his treatise, used the Kautilya Recension. Time and again, as McClish has shown (2009, 203-209; 212), Manu fails to refer to the redactorial additions we have identified in the AS. * McClish (2019, pp. 146, 149): "The correspondence between Manu's seventh chapter and the Dandanati is extensive [...] In many places, there is an identical progression of topics using the same technical terms [...] the progression of topics is nearly perfect with the extent of the Dandanati as I have posited it. Manu fails to mention topics from several chapters that I have assigned to the [Sastric] redaction [...] Even more tellingly, Manu passes over all the content found in the fifth, eleventh, twelfth, and fourteenth books, each of which I have linked to the [Sastric] redaction.")

According to Olivelle (2013), this recension was redacted into the "Śāstric Redaction" (i.e., the text as we have it today) between 175 and 300 CE, and was a major redaction by a scholar who had a good knowledge of the Dharmashastras, bringing the Arthashastra "more in line with the mainstream of Brahmanical social ideology" and the superiority of the Brahmin varna. (Note: The Mauryan rulers, being based in Magadha, were sympathetic to the sramana-movements of Buddhism, Jainism and Aijivika.) This author (redactor) added a division into books and chapters, and also added several books, as identified by McClish (2009). He also expanded short, sutra-like statements into extended commentaries in dialogue form. According to Olivelle, "[t]he artificiality of these dialogues has been noted by scholars," and that they disrupt and disfigure the composition. They may have been added to emphasize Kautilya's authorship, presenting him "as someone standing in a long line of Arthashastric authorities, someone who has surpassed them all when he composed his Arthashastra. According to Olivelle, it was this Shastric redactor who "created an Arthashastra out of a Daņdanīti." With regard to dating, Kalidasa (4th–5th century CE) clearly used this Shastric Redaction.

Olivelle rejects the dating to the Mauryan period, and adds the additional argument, derived from the work of Schlingloff, of the usage of wood for the fortications excavated at Pāṭaliputra, whereas Arthashastra 2.3.8–9 forbids this usage in defensive fortications. Olivelle also refers to the coral-argument for the dating of the source-texts; the import of this coral cannot be dated earlier than the first century BCE.

According to McClish (2019), a treatise he calls the Dandanīti was created in the first century BCE by an unknown author, who drew "together a number of disparate sources pertaining to statecraft, added some of his own material, and forged them into a comprehensive treatise." Thereafter, possibly in the third century CE, "an individual who called himself “Kautilya” redacted the Dandanīti. Kautilya added a great deal of new material, including the division into chapters and the addition of several books, recast the text in the ideological image of the dharma literature, and renamed it the Arthaśāstra of Kautilya." The date of the third century is based on a comparison with the Manu Dharmashastra (2nd century CE), which appears to have used the Dandanati, and not the Arthashastra, which means that the redaction of the Dandanati into the Arthashastra took place after the second century CE. This is corroborated by the first substantial Sanskrit inscription, dated at the middle of the second century CE. Since the Arthashastra prescribes inscriptions in Sanskrit, their absence in the centuries directly after 300 BCE is problematic for the traditional attribution to Chanakya, but fits well with an initial compilation before 150 BCE, and a major redaction after 150 BCE. McClish further notes that "[t]he guidelines provided by the Dandanati would have been insufficient to Chandragupta's imperial project," hence, "[t] he Dandanati is not an imperial text." As for the lower limit of the dating, McClish also refers to Levy's coral-argument. With regard to the upper limit, McClish too, following Trautman, refers to the disappearance of punch-mark coins in the second century CE, which are mentioned extensively though in the Dandanati, which means that it was compiled before this period.

=== Authorship ===
According to Olivelle, "[g]iven the compositional history outlined above, the very question regarding the date or the author of the AS becomes moot. We have to instead seek dates and authors in the plural for the three major phases of its composition: the sources used by Kauṭilya, the original Kauṭilya composition, and the subsequent Śāstric Redaction." Regarding the original compilation and its later major redaction, three names for the text's compilor are used in various historical sources: "Kauṭilya" or its variant "Kauṭalya", Vishnugupta, and Chanakya. (Note: Mabbett (1964) states that these three refer to the same person: "References to the work in other Sanskrit literature attribute it variously to Viṣṇugupta, Cāṇakya and Kauṭilya. The same individual is meant in each case. The Pańcatantra explicitly identifies Chanakya with Viṣṇugupta.")

==== Kauṭilya or Kauṭalya ====
The text identifies its author by the name "Kauṭilya" or its variant "Kauṭalya." According to Olivelle, this person was probably the author of the original recension of Arthashastra: this recension must have been based on works by earlier writers, as suggested by the Arthashastra's opening verse, which states that its author consulted the so-called "Arthashastras" to compose a new treatise. Olivelle argues that this must be the real name of the author, because many shastra received an epynomic ascription to a celebrated figure, which is not the case with "Kautilya", a relatively unknown name except as an obscure gotra-name. According to McClish, the original compilation was the work of an anonymous author, while the major expansion and redaction was the work of an author called Kautilya.

Both spellings appear in manuscripts, commentaries, and references in other ancient texts; the original spelling of the author's name has been extensively debated by contemporary scholars, but was not an issue for Sanskrit authors. Vishakhadatta's Mudrarakshasa (4th–8th cent. CE), which uses all three names, refers to Chanakya as kutila-mati ("crafty-minded"), where kutila ("crafty", "crooked") is intended, in which case "the name Kautilya would be a kind of nickname which was given to him on account of the well-known crookedness (kautilyam) of his policy." (Note: Burrow (1968, p. 24): "This explanation of the name Kautilya has been accepted by a number of modern authorities, for instance by Winternitz, who uses it as an argument against the identification, and by P. V. Kane, who considered it "not unlikely that Cànakya acquired the epithet Kautilya on account of his methods in dealing with the Nandas and that as he did so from no purely selfish motives but for ridding the country of such tyrants as the Nandas are represented to have been, he might have come to relish the name given to him by the people."") However, as Burrow pointed out, such a derivation of a masculine noun from an adjective (kutila) is grammatically impossible, and Vishakhadatta's usage is simply a pun. The word "Kauṭilya" or "Kauṭalya" appears to be the name of a gotra (lineage), and is used in this sense in the later literature and inscriptions. Nevertheless, Vishakhadatta's pun may have had unintended consequences, as later Sanskrit texts supportive of his work omit the name Kautilya, while those with negative views are keen to use it.

==== Vishnugupta ====
A verse at the end of the text identifies its author as "Vishnugupta" (Viṣṇugupta), stating that Vishnugupta himself composed both the text and its commentary, after noticing "many errors committed by commentators on treatises". R. P. Kangle theorized that Vishnugupta was the personal name of the author while Chanakya (Cāṇakya) was the name of his gotra. Others, such as Thomas Burrow and Patrick Olivelle, point out that none of the earliest sources that refer to Chanakya mention the name "Vishnugupta". According to these scholars, "Vishnugupta" may have been the personal name of the author whose gotra name was "Kautilya": this person, however, was different from Chanakya. Historian K C Ojha theorizes that Vishnugupta was the redactor of the final recension of the text.

==== Chanakya ====
A persistent tradition attributes the Arthashastra to the Maurya prime minister Chanakya. The identification is implied at the penultimate paragraph of the Arthashastra, which states, "without the explicit use of the name Canakya," that the treatise was authored by the person who rescued the country from the Nanda kings," that is, the Maurya prime minister Chanakya who according to tradition played a pivotal role in the overthrow of the Nanda dynasty.

Several Gupta-era (c. 3rd century CE – 575 CE) and mediaeval texts also identify Kautilya or Vishnagupta with Chanakya. Among the earliest of these sources, Mudrarakshasa (4th–8th cent. CE) is the only one that uses all three names - Kauṭilya, Vishnugupta, and Chanakya - to refer to the same person. The Panchatantra (300 CE) and Vishnugupta (e.g. Kamandaka's Nitisara (3rd–7th cent. CE) use the name Chanakya. Dandin's Dashakumaracharita (7th–8th cent. CE) uses both Chanakya and Vishnugupta ), while Bana's Kadambari (7th. cent. CE) uses Kautilya. The Puranas (Vishnu (400–900 CE), Vayu (300–500 CE), and Matsya (200–500 CE)) are the only among the ancient texts that use the name "Kautilya", instead of the more common "Chanakya", to describe the Maurya prime minister.

Trautmann points out that none of the earlier sources that refer to Chanakya mention his authorship of the Arthashastra, and Olivelle notes that "the name Canakya, however, is completely absent from the text." This identification seems to be a forgery from the Gupta period. The Guptas tried to present themselves symbolically as the legitimate successors of the Mauryas, even using the names "Chandragupta" and "Gupta", a connection also made in the play Mudrarakshasa, composed in the time of the Guptas. The verse seems to be a later interpolation, and Olivelle proposes that it was an attempt to identify the author of the political treatise, which was followed by the Guptas, with the renowned Maurya prime minister.

Olivelle notes that "Given the later association between the AŚ and Cāṇakya, who is regarded as the prime minister of Chandragupta Maurya, there has been a trend from the inception of Arthaśāstra scholarship to date the text to the Maurya period." Several reasons are given for the persistent scholarly attribution to Chanakya, and the a priori dating to Mauryan times. One reason is the reception by Indian nationalists, who saw it "as evidence of a pragmatic and virile tradition of self-rule in India's past." According to Trautmann, "[n]ationalist aspirations seemed somehow fortified when the existence of strongly centralized empires and native schools of political theory was shown." Furthermore, the identification with Kautilya provided "a link to the most powerful dynasty in South Asian antiquity: the Mauryan Empire," while "[g]iven the absolute paucity of sources for this most intriguing era, many scholars seem unable to resist using the Arthaśāstra as a source for the period, despite a decided lack of supporting evidence." According to McClish, "the desire on the part of Indologists to possess just such a source seems to have exerted, in general, a strong influence on conclusions about the compositional history of the text."

==== Anachronistic historical elements ====
Within a few years after its discovery in 1909, scholars questioned this identification, pointing to historical anachronisms and lack of synchronicity with the Mauryan period. R. P. Kangle, whose translation dates from the 1960s, deemed this traditional attribution acceptable, and therefore dates the Arthashastra to Mauryan times. (Note: Olivelle (2013, p. 25):"Kangle (1965, 106): “We may, therefore, conclude that there is no convincing reason why this work should not be regarded as the work of Kauṭilya, who helped Candragupta to come to power in Magadha.”") Thomas Trautmann, Olivelle and others reject this identification of Chanakya and Kautilya arguing that it is incompatible with the dating and multiple authorship. A number of arguments against a dating around 300 BCE have been given since 1915. Burrow (1968), Trautmann (1971), Olivelle (2013), and McClish (2019), give the following overview of anachronistic historical elements:

- Small local state: the Arthashastra is intended for a small state surrounded by other small states, and not for an extensive empire. (Note: Kulke and Rothermund, writing in 1986, prseume the attribution to Kautilya to be correct, but agree that the Arthashastra describes a constellation of small states. They explain this by positing that the small states mentioned in the Arthashastra are the Pre-Mauryan Mahajanapadas, with Kautilya narrating the conditions that existed during the Mahajanapadas rather than the state of the Mauryan Empire during Chandragupta's time.)
- Gems and aloe from Ceylon: Hemachandra Raychaudhuri noted in 1919 that gems and aloe from Ceylon are described as pārasamudraka, "from Simhala"; were the text from Mauryan times, it would have used Tamraparni for Ceylon, not Parasamudra.
- Chinese silk: S. Lévi noted in 1936 that Arthashastra 2.11.114 mentions Chinese silk, Cinapatta, "originating in China (Cinabhumi). The Indian name for China is derived from the Ch'in (Qin)-dynasty, which was established in 221 BCE, post-dating the time of Chanakya and Chandragupta Maurya. This means that the Arthashastra cannot be attributed to Chanakya.
- Coral: S. Lévi also noted, in 1934, that Arthashastra 2.11.42 refers to coral imported from Alexandria. This trade flourished in the early centuries of the Common Era. There are no references in Panini and Patanjali, but plenty in sources from the early Common Era. Therefore, "the mention of Alexandrian coral in the Arthashastra is irreconcilable with the attribution of it to Canakya."
- Wine and Hunas: Arthashastra 2.25.24–25 refers to wine, with an etymology derived from the Hunas, which is impossible for a work from the 4th century BCE.
- Greek loan-words: the term surungā, "underground passage, tunnel", is a loanword from Hellenistic Greek surinx, which is not used as such before the 2nd century BCE. Likewise, paristoma (2.11.98), "a kind of blanket or carpet", is a loanword from Hellenistic Greek peristròma, not attested before the third century BCE.
- Written documents: while the Arthashastra often refers to written documents, and treats the composition of written documents in a specific chapter, yet writing may not have existed in India when the Mauryan empire was founded.
- Alchemy and metal-working: there are references to alchemy in the Arthashastra, which is probably a western influence. Also, the level of metal-working described in the Arthashastra does not correspond with the time of Chanakya.
- Civil law: Burrow notes that "The chapter on civil law (vyavahãra) represents a state of development on the same level as that in the Yàjnavalkya-smrti, a work commonly assigned to the fourth century AD."
- Sanskrit in royal edicts: Trautmann notes that Book II chapter 10 ciof the Arthashastra itself refers to the use of Sanskrit in royal edicts, which began in 150 CE, setting an earliest date for the text.
- Defensive fortications: according to Megasthenes Pataliputra was "surrounded by a wooden wall pierced by 64 gates and 570 towers." Olivelle notes that "AŚ (2.3.8–9) forbids the use of wood in defensive fortications of cities because of the obvious danger posed by fire. Yet, while Schlingloff shows that the description of fortifications in the Arthashastra is pretty accurate when compared with archaeological remains, the fortications excavated at Pāṭaliputra, the capital of the Maurya empire, are made of wood," something which would have been impossible if it was the prime minister of Chandragupta had authored the Arthashastra. "The data on the construction of forts in the AŚ (2.3), therefore, must come from a period later than the Maurya."
- Roman dīnāra: Trautmann notes that one of the earliest texts referring to the Arthashastra, the Pancatantra, uses the word dīnāra a Roman coin not used in India before the Common Era.
- Punched-marked coins: chapter 12 mentions punched-marked coins, which disappeared at the end of the second century, setting the latest possible date for that text.

=== Geography - written in Gujarat ===
The author of Arthashastra uses the term gramakuta to describe a village official or chief, which, according to Thomas Burrow, suggests that he was a native of the region that encompasses present-day Gujarat and northern Maharashtra, in contrast to Chanakya, who resided in northern India. Other evidences also support this theory: the text mentions that the shadow of a sundial disappears at noon during the month of Ashadha (June–July), and that the day and night are equal during the months of Chaitra (March–April) and Ashvayuja (September–October). This is possible only in the areas lying along the Tropic of Cancer, which passes through central India, from Gujarat in the west to Bengal in the east.

The author of the text appears to be most familiar with the historical regions of Avanti and Ashmaka, which included parts of present-day Gujarat and Maharashtra. He provides precise annual rainfall figures for these historical regions in the text. Plus, he shows familiarity with sea-trade, which can be explained by the existence of ancient sea ports such as Sopara in the Gujarat-Maharashtra region. Lastly, the gotra name Kauṭilya is still found in Maharashtra.

== Contents ==
=== Organisation ===
Arthashastra is divided into 15 book titles, 150 chapters and 180 topics, as follows:

1. On the Subject of Training, 21 chapters, Topics 1–18
2. On the Activities of Superintendents, 36 chapters, Topics 19–56 (largest book)
3. On Justices, 20 chapters, Topics 57–75
4. Eradication of Thorns, 13 chapters, Topics 76–88
5. On Secret Conduct, 6 chapters, Topics 89–95
6. Basis of the Circle, 2 chapters, Topics 96–97
7. On the Sixfold Strategy, 18 chapters, Topics 98–126
8. On the Subject of Calamities, 5 chapters, Topics 127–134
9. Activity of a King preparing to March into Battle, 7 chapters, Topics 135–146
10. On War, 6 chapters, Topics 147–159
11. Conduct toward Confederacies, 1 chapter, Topics 160–161
12. On the Weaker King, 5 chapters, Topics 162–170
13. Means of Capturing a Fort, 5 chapters, Topics 171–176
14. On Esoteric Practices, 4 chapters, Topics 177–179
15. Organization of a Scientific Treatise, 1 chapter, Topic 180

=== The need for law, economics and government ===
The ancient Sanskrit text opens, in chapter 2 of Book 1 (the first chapter is table of contents), by acknowledging that there are a number of extant schools with different theories on proper and necessary number of fields of knowledge, and asserts they all agree that the science of government is one of those fields. It lists the school of Brihaspati, the school of Usanas, the school of Manu and itself as the school of Kautilya as examples.

सुखस्य मूलं धर्मः । धर्मस्य मूलं अर्थः । अर्थस्य मूलं राज्यं । राज्यस्य मूलं इन्द्रिय जयः । इन्द्रियाजयस्य मूलं विनयः । विनयस्य मूलं वृद्धोपसेवा॥

The root of happiness is Dharma (ethics, righteousness), the root of Dharma is Artha (economy, polity), the root of Artha is right governance, the root of right governance is victorious inner-restraint, the root of victorious inner-restraint is humility, the root of humility is serving the aged.

— Kautilya, Chanakya Sutra 1-6

The school of Usanas asserts, states the text, that there is only one necessary knowledge, the science of government because no other science can start or survive without it. The school of Brihaspati asserts, according to Arthashastra, that there are only two fields of knowledge, the science of government and the science of economics (Varta (Note: Olivelle (2013, p. 43) transliterates this word as Vārttā, translates it as "roughly economics", and notes that Kautilya placed the knowledge of economics at the heart of king's education.) of agriculture, cattle and trade) because all other sciences are intellectual and mere flowering of the temporal life of man. The school of Manu asserts, states Arthashastra, that there are three fields of knowledge, the Vedas, the science of government and the science of economics (Varta of agriculture, cattle and trade) because these three support each other, and all other sciences are special branch of the Vedas.

The Arthashastra then posits its own theory that there are four necessary fields of knowledge, the Vedas, the Anvikshaki (science of reasoning), (Note: Kangle (1965, pp. 99–100), Part III, transliterates this word as Anviksiki , and states that this term may be better conceptualized as science of reasoning rather than full philosophy, in ancient Indian traditions.) the science of government and the science of economics (Varta of agriculture, cattle and trade). It is from these four that all other knowledge, wealth and human prosperity is derived. The Kautilya text thereafter asserts that it is the Vedas that discuss what is Dharma (right, moral, ethical) and what is Adharma (wrong, immoral, unethical), it is the Varta that explain what creates wealth and what destroys wealth, it is the science of government that illuminates what is Nyaya (justice, expedient, proper) and Anyaya (unjust, inexpedient, improper), and that it is Anvishaki (philosophy) that is the light of these sciences, as well as the source of all knowledge, the guide to virtues, and the means to all kinds of acts. He says of government in general:

Without government, rises disorder as in the Matsya nyayamud bhavayati (proverb on law of fishes). In the absence of governance, the strong will swallow the weak. In the presence of governance, the weak resists the strong.

=== Raja (king) ===
The best king is the Raja-rishi, the sage king.

The Raja-rishi is described as having absolute self-control and not falling for the temptations of the senses, learning continuously and cultivating his thoughts, avoiding false and flattering advisors and instead associating with true and accomplished elders, promoting the security and welfare of his people, enriching and empowering his people, living a simple life and avoiding harmful people or activities, and staying away from another's wife and not craving other people's property. The greatest enemies of a king are described as not others, but are these six: lust, anger, greed, conceit, arrogance and foolhardiness. A just king is said to gain the loyalty of his people not because he is king, but because he is just.

=== Officials, advisors and checks on government ===
Book 1 and Book 2 of the text discusses how the crown prince should be trained and how the king himself should continue learning, selecting his key Mantri (ministers), officials, administration, staffing of the court personnel, magistrates and judges.

Topic 2 of the Arthashastra, or chapter 5 of Book 1, is dedicated to the continuous training and development of the king, where the text advises that he maintain a counsel of elders, from each field of various sciences, whose accomplishments he knows and respects. Topic 4 of the text describes the process of selecting the ministers and key officials, which it states must be based on king's personal knowledge of their honesty and capacity. Kautilya first lists various different opinions among extant scholars on how key government officials should be selected, with Bharadvaja suggesting honesty and knowledge be the screen for selection, Kaunapadanta suggesting that heredity be favored, Visalaksha suggesting that king should hire those whose weaknesses he can exploit, Parasara cautioning against hiring vulnerable people because they will try to find king's vulnerability to exploit him instead, and yet another who insists that experience and not theoretical qualification be primary selection criterion.

Kautilya, after describing the conflicting views on how to select officials, asserts that a king should select his Amatyah (ministers and high officials) based on the capacity to perform that they have shown in their past work, the character and their values that is accordance with the role. The Amatyah, states Arthashastra, must be those with following Amatya-sampat: well trained, with foresight, with strong memory, bold, well spoken, enthusiastic, excellence in their field of expertise, learned in theoretical and practical knowledge, pure of character, of good health, kind and philanthropic, free from procrastination, free from ficklemindedness, free from hate, free from enmity, free from anger, and dedicated to dharma. Those who lack one or a few of these characteristics must be considered for middle or lower positions in the administration, working under the supervision of more senior officials. The text describes tests to screen for the various Amatya-sampat.

The Arthashastra, in Topic 6, describes checks and continuous measurement, in secret, of the integrity and lack of integrity of all ministers and high officials in the kingdom. Those officials who lack integrity must be arrested. Those who are unrighteous, should not work in civil and criminal courts. Those who lack integrity in financial matters or fall for the lure of money must not be in revenue collection or treasury, states the text, and those who lack integrity in sexual relationships must not be appointed to Vihara services (pleasure grounds). The highest level ministers must have been tested and have successfully demonstrated integrity in all situations and all types of allurements.

Chapter 9 of Book 1 suggests that the king maintain a council and a Purohit (chaplain, spiritual guide) for his personal counsel. The Purohit, claims the text, must be one who is well educated in the Vedas and its six Angas.

=== Causes of impoverishment, lack of motivation and disaffection among people ===
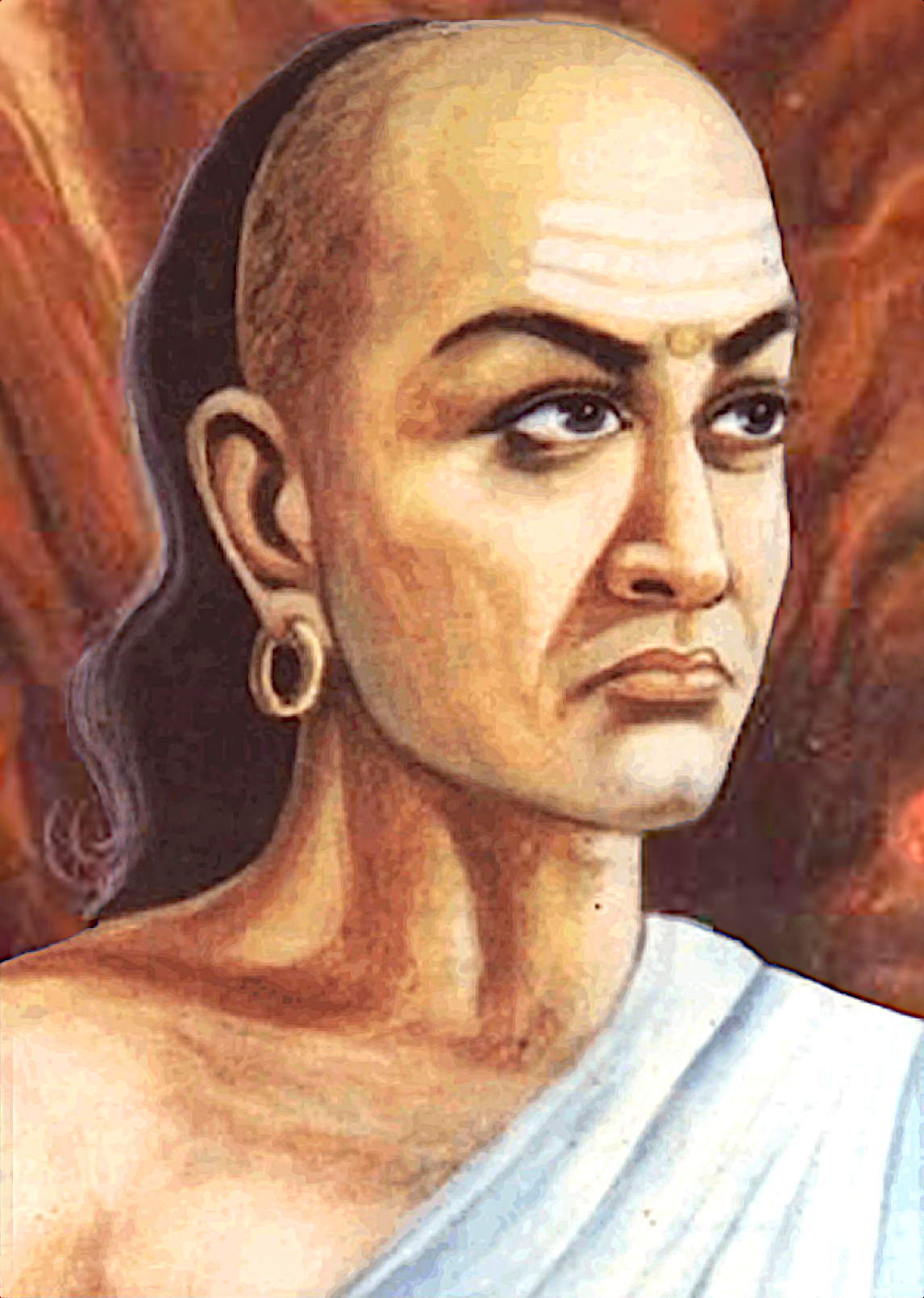
Fanciful portrait of Chanakya illustrating Shamasastry's 1915 translation of the Arthashastra.

The Arthashastra, in Topic 109, Book 7 lists the causes of disaffection, lack of motivation and increase in economic distress among people. It opens by stating that wherever "good people are snubbed, and evil people are embraced" distress increases. Wherever officials or people initiate unprecedented violence in acts or words, wherever there is unrighteous acts of violence, disaffection grows. When the king rejects the Dharma, that is "does what ought not to be done, does not do what ought to be done, does not give what ought to be given, and gives what ought not to be given", the king causes people to worry and dislike him.

Anywhere, states Arthashastra in verse 7.5.22, where people are fined or punished or harassed when they ought not to be harassed, where those that should be punished are not punished, where those people are apprehended when they ought not be, where those who are not apprehended when they ought to, the king and his officials cause distress and disaffection. When officials engage in thievery, instead of providing protection against robbers, the people are impoverished, they lose respect and become disaffected.

A state, asserts Arthashastra text in verses 7.5.24 - 7.5.25, where courageous activity is denigrated, quality of accomplishments are disparaged, pioneers are harmed, honorable men are dishonored, where deserving people are not rewarded but instead favoritism and falsehood is, that is where people lack motivation, are distressed, become upset and disloyal.

In verse 7.5.33, the ancient text remarks that general impoverishment relating to food and survival money destroys everything, while other types of impoverishment can be addressed with grants of grain and money.

=== Civil, criminal law and court system ===
Crime and punishment

It is power and power alone which, only when exercised by the king with impartiality and in proportion to guilt either over his son or his enemy, maintains both this world and the next.
The just and victorious king administers justice in accordance with Dharma (established law), Sanstha (customary law), Nyaya (edicts, announced law) and Vyavahara (evidence, conduct).

— Arthashastra 3.1

Book 3 of the Arthashastra, according to Trautmann, is dedicated to civil law, including sections relating to economic relations of employer and employee, partnerships, sellers and buyers. Book 4 is a treatise on criminal law, where the king or officials acting on his behalf, take the initiative and start the judicial process against acts of crime, because the crime is felt to be a wrong against the people of the state. This system, as Trautmann points out, is similar to European system of criminal law, rather than other historic legal system, because in the European (and Arthashastra) system it is the state that initiates judicial process in cases that fall under criminal statutes, while in the latter systems the aggrieved party initiates a claim in the case of murder, rape, bodily injury among others.

The ancient text stipulates that the courts have a panel of three pradeshtri (magistrates) for handling criminal cases, and this panel is different, separate and independent of the panel of judges of civil court system it specifies for a Hindu kingdom. The text lays out that just punishment is one that is in proportion to the crime in many sections starting with chapter 4 of Book 1, and repeatedly uses this principle in specifying punishments, for example in Topic 79, that is chapter 2 of Book 4. Economic crimes such as conspiracy by a group of traders or artisans is to be, states the Arthashastra, punished with much larger and punitive collective fine than those individually, as conspiracy causes systematic damage to the well-being of the people.

=== Marriage laws ===
The text discusses marriage and consent laws in Books 3 and 4. It asserts, in chapter 4.2, that a girl may marry any man she wishes, (Note: The girl, notes Olivelle (2013, p. 248), may marry a man of equal status or any status (no mention of caste, the original Sanskrit text does not use the word Varna or any other related to caste).) (Note: Rangarajan (1992, pp. 49, 364), however, translates the verse to "same varna or another varna".) three years after her first menstruation, provided that she does not take her parents' property or ornaments received by her before the marriage. However, if she marries a man her father arranges or approves of, she has the right to take the ornaments with her.

In chapter 3.4, the text gives the right to a woman that she may remarry anyone if she wants to, if she has been abandoned by the man she was betrothed to, if she does not hear back from him for three menstrual periods, or if she does hear back and has waited for seven menses.

The chapter 2 of Book 3 of Arthashastra legally recognizes eight types of marriage. The bride is given the maximum property inheritance rights when the parents select the groom and the girl consents to the selection (Brahma marriage), and minimal if bride and groom marry secretly as lovers (Gandharva marriage) without the approval of her father and her mother. However, in cases of Gandharva marriage (love), she is given more rights than she has in Brahma marriage (arranged), if the husband uses the property she owns or has created, with husband required to repay her with interest when she demands.

=== Wildlife and forests ===
Arthashastra states that forests be protected and recommends that the state treasury be used to feed animals such as horses and elephants that are too old for work, sick or injured. However, Kautilya also recommends that wildlife that is damaging crops should be restrained with state resources. In Topic 19, chapter 2, the text suggests:

The king should grant exemption [from taxes]
to a region devastated by an enemy king or tribe,
to a region beleaguered by sickness or famine.
He should safeguard agriculture
when it is stressed by the hardships of fines, forced labor, taxes, and animal herds
when they are harassed by thieves, vicious animals, poison, crocodiles or sickness
He should keep trade routes [roads] clear
when they are oppressed by anyone, including his officers, robbers or frontier commanders
when they are worn out by farm animals
The king should protect produce, forests, elephants forests, reservoirs and mines
established in the past and also set up new ones.

In topic 35, the text recommends that the "Superintendent of Forest Produce" appointed by the state for each forest zone be responsible for maintaining the health of the forest, protecting forests to assist wildlife such as elephants (hastivana), but also producing forest products to satisfy economic needs, products such as Teak, Palmyra, Mimosa, Sissu, Kauki, Sirisha, Catechu, Latifolia, Arjuna, Tilaka, Tinisa, Sal, Robesta, Pinus, Somavalka, Dhava, Birch, bamboo, hemp, Balbaja (used for ropes), Munja, fodder, firewood, bulbous roots and fruits for medicine, flowers. The Arthashastra also reveals that the Mauryas designated specific forests to protect supplies of timber, as well as deer, for skins {8.4.44,45}.

=== Mines, factories and superintendents ===
The Arthashastra dedicates Topics 30 through 47 discussing the role of government in setting up mines and factories, gold and precious stone workshops, commodities, forest produce, armory, standards for balances and weight measures, standards for length and time measures, customs, agriculture, liquor, abattoirs and courtesans, shipping, domesticated animals such as cattle, horses and elephants along with animal welfare when they are injured or too old, pasture land, military preparedness and intelligence gathering operations of the state.

=== On spying, propaganda and information ===
Femme fatale as a secret agent

To undermine a ruling oligarchy, make chiefs of the [enemy's] ruling council infatuated with women possessed of great beauty and youth. When passion is roused in them, they should start quarrels by creating belief (about their love) in one and by going to another.

— Arthashastra 11.1

The Arthashastra dedicates many chapters on the need, methods and goals of secret service, and how to build then use a network of spies that work for the state. The spies should be trained to adopt roles and guises, to use coded language to transmit information, and be rewarded by their performance and the results they achieve, states the text. (Note: According to Shoham and Liebig, this was a 'textbook of Statecraft and Political Economy' that provides a detailed account of intelligence collection, processing, consumption, and covert operations, as indispensable means for maintaining and expanding the security and power of the state.)

The roles and guises recommended for Vyanjana (appearance) agents by the Arthashastra include ascetics, forest hermits, mendicants, cooks, merchants, doctors, astrologers, householders, entertainers, dancers, female agents and others. It suggests that members from these professions should be sought to serve for the secret service. A prudent state, states the text, must expect that its enemies seek information and are spying inside its territory and spreading propaganda, and therefore it must train and reward double agents to gain identity about such hostile intelligence operations.

The goals of the secret service, in Arthashastra, was to test the integrity of government officials, spy on cartels and population for conspiracy, to monitor hostile kingdoms suspected of preparing for war or in war against the state, to check spying and propaganda wars by hostile states, to destabilize enemy states, to get rid of troublesome powerful people who could not be challenged openly. The spy operations and its targets, states verse 5.2.69 of Arthashastra, should be pursued "with respect to traitors and unrighteous people, not with respect to others".

=== On war and peace ===
The Arthashastra dedicates Book 7 and 10 to war, and considers numerous scenarios and reasons for war. It classifies war into three broad types – open war, covert war and silent war. It then dedicates chapters to defining each type of war, how to engage in these wars and how to detect that one is a target of covert or silent types of war. The text cautions that the king should know the progress he expects to make, when considering the choice between waging war and pursuing peace. The text asserts:

When the degree of progress is the same in pursuing peace and waging war, peace is to be preferred. For, in war, there are disadvantages such as losses, expenses and absence from home.

Kautilya, in the Arthashastra, suggests that the state must always be adequately fortified, its armed forces prepared and resourced to defend itself against acts of war. Kautilya favors peace over war, because he asserts that in most situations, peace is more conducive to creation of wealth, prosperity and security of the people. Arthashastra defines the value of peace and the term peace, states Brekke, as "effort to achieve the results of work undertaken is industry, and absence of disturbance to the enjoyment of the results achieved from work is peace".

All means to win a war are appropriate in the Arthashastra, including assassination of enemy leaders, sowing discord in its leadership, engagement of covert men and women in the pursuit of military objectives and as weapons of war, deployment of accepted superstitions and propaganda to bolster one's own troops or to demoralize enemy soldiers, as well as open hostilities by deploying kingdom's armed forces. After success in a war by the victorious just and noble state, the text argues for humane treatment of conquered soldiers and subjects.

The Arthashastra theories are similar to some and in contrast to other alternative theories on war and peace in the ancient Indian tradition. For example, states Brekke, the legends in Hindu epics preach heroism qua heroism which is in contrast to Kautilya suggestion of prudence and never forgetting the four Hindu goals of human life, while Kamandaki's Nitisara, which is similar to Kautilya's Arthashastra, is among other Hindu classics on statecraft and foreign policy that suggest prudence, engagement and diplomacy, peace is preferable and must be sought, and yet prepared to excel and win war if one is forced to.

=== Foreign policy ===
Behaviour of a Weak King

One should neither submit spinelessly nor sacrifice oneself in foolhardy valour. It is better to adopt such policies as would enable one to survive and live to fight another day.

— Arthashastra 7.15.13-20, 12.1.1-9

In the Arthashastra, Books 7, 11 and 12 have given a comprehensive analysis on all aspects of the relations between states. In the first chapter of Book 6, the theoretical basis of foreign policy are described. This includes six-fold foreign policy and the Mandala Theory of foreign policy.

=== On regulations and taxes ===
The Arthashastra discusses a mixed economy, where private enterprise and state enterprise frequently competed side by side, in agriculture, animal husbandry, forest produce, mining, manufacturing and trade. However, royal statutes and officials regulated private economic activities, some economic activity was the monopoly of the state, and a superintendent oversaw that both private and state owned enterprises followed the same regulations. The private enterprises were taxed. Mines were state owned, but leased to private parties for operations, according to chapter 2.12 of the text. The Arthashastra states that protecting the consumer must be an important priority for the officials of the kingdom.

Tax collection and ripe fruits

As one plucks one ripe fruit after another from a garden, so should the king from his kingdom. Out of fear for his own destruction, he should avoid unripe ones, which give rise to revolts.

— Stocking the Treasury, Arthashastra 5.2.70

Arthashastra stipulates restraint on taxes imposed, fairness, the amounts and how tax increases should be implemented. Further, the text suggests that the tax should be "convenient to pay, easy to calculate, inexpensive to administer, equitable and non-distortive, and not inhibit growth. Fair taxes build popular support for the king, states the text, and some manufacturers and artisans, such as those of textiles, were subject to a flat tax. The Arthashastra states that taxes should only be collected from ripened economic activity, and should not be collected from early, unripe stages of economic activity. Historian of economic thought Joseph Spengler notes:

Kautilya's discussion of taxation and expenditure gave expression to three Indian principles: taxing power [of state] is limited; taxation should not be felt to be heavy or exclusive [discriminatory]; tax increases should be graduated.

Agriculture on privately owned land was taxed at the rate of 16.67%, but the tax was exempted in cases of famine, epidemic, and settlement into new pastures previously uncultivated and if damaged during a war. New public projects such as irrigation and water works were exempt from taxes for five years, and major renovations to ruined or abandoned water works were granted tax exemption for four years. Temple and gurukul lands were exempt from taxes, fines or penalties. Trade into and outside the kingdom's borders was subject to toll fees or duties. Taxes varied between 10% and 25% on industrialists and businessmen, and it could be paid in kind (produce), through labor, or in cash.

=== Pregnancy and abortion ===
On abortion

When a person causes abortion in pregnancy by striking, or with medicine, or by annoyance, the highest, middlemost, and first amercements shall be imposed respectively.

— Arthashastra 4.11.6

In general, causing an abortion had varying penalties. There was severe punishment for aborting a slave woman. For a woman convicted of murder, the sentence of drowning was executed a month after child birth. Pregnant women were also given free ferry rides.

== Influence and reception ==
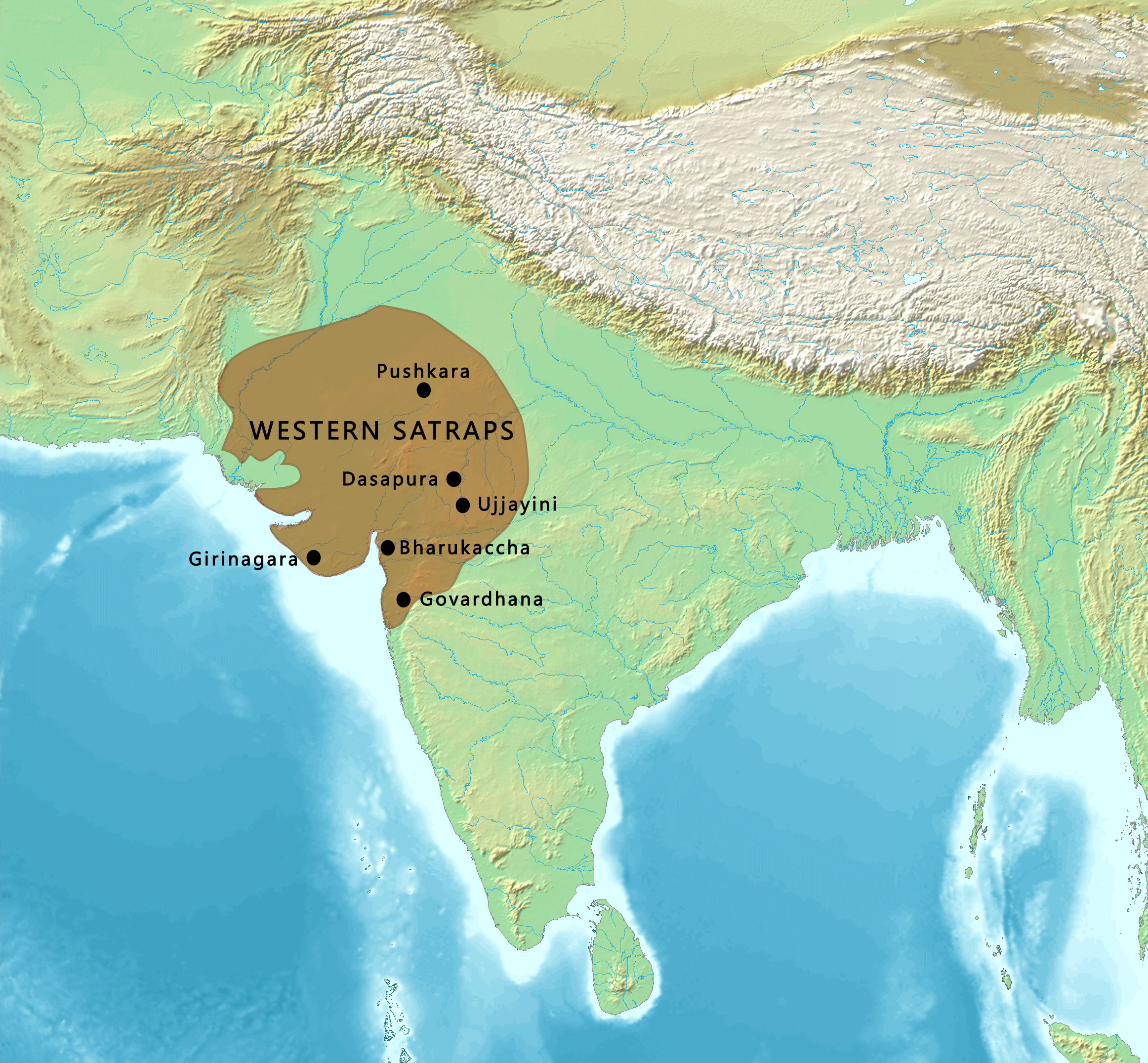
Approximate territory of the Western Satraps (35–415) circa 350 CE

Based on the misidentification with Chanakya, scholars state that the Arthashastra was influential in Asian history. According to Boesche, writing in 2003, its ideas helped create one of the largest empires in South Asia, stretching (possibly) from the Hindu kush to Bengal on the other side of the Indian subcontinent, with its capital Pataliputra twice as large as Rome under Emperor Marcus Aurelius.

Chanakya's patron Chandragupta Maurya consolidated an empire which was inherited by his son Bindusara and then his grandson Ashoka.

=== Comparisons to Machiavelli ===
In 1919, a few years after the newly discovered Arthashastra manuscript's translation was first published, Max Weber stated:

Truly radical "Machiavellianism", in the popular sense of that word, is classically expressed in Indian literature in the Arthashastra of Kautilya (written long before the birth of Christ, ostensibly in the time of Chandragupta): compared to it, Machiavelli's The Prince is harmless.

More recent scholarship has disagreed with the characterization of Arthashastra as "Machiavellianism". Kautilya asserts in Arthashastra that, "the ultimate source of the prosperity of the kingdom is its security and prosperity of its people", a view never mentioned in Machiavelli's text. The text advocates land reform, where land is taken from landowners and farmers who own land but do not grow anything for a long time, and given to poorer farmers who want to grow crops but do not own any land.

Arthashastra declares, in numerous occasions, the need for empowering the weak and poor in one's kingdom, a sentiment that is not found in Machiavelli. "The king shall also provide subsistence to helpless women when they are carrying and also to the children they give birth to". Elsewhere, the text values not just powerless human life, but even animal life and suggests in Book 2 that horses and elephants be given food, when they become incapacitated from old age, disease or after war.

=== Views on the role of the state ===
Roger Boesche, who relied entirely on the 1969 translation by Kangle for his analysis of Arthashastra, and who criticized an alternative 1992 translation by Rangarajan, has called the Arthashastra "a great political book of the ancient world". He interprets that the text, which he dates to the 1st millennium BCE following Kangle, is grounded more like the Soviet Union and China where the state envisions itself as driven by the welfare of the common good, but operates an extensive spy state and system of surveillance. This view has been challenged by Thomas Trautmann, who asserts that a free market and individual rights, albeit a regulated system, are proposed by Arthashastra. Boesche is not summarily critical and adds:

Kautilya's Arthashastra depicts a bureaucratic welfare state, in fact some kind of socialized monarchy, in which the central government administers the details of the economy for the common good...In addition, Kautilya offers a work of genius in matters of foreign policy and welfare, including key principles of international relations from a realist perspective and a discussion of when an army must use cruel violence and when it is more advantageous to be humane.

Scholars disagree on how to interpret the document. Kumud Mookerji states that the text may be a picture of actual conditions in Kautilya's times. However, Bhargava states that given Kautilya was the prime minister, one must expect that he implemented the ideas in the book.

=== Views on property and markets ===
Thomas Trautmann states that the Arthashastra in chapter 3.9 recognizes the concept of land ownership rights and other private property, and requires the king to protect that right from seizure or abuse. There is no question, according to Trautmann, that people had the power to buy and sell land. However, Trautmann adds, this does not mean that Kautilya was advocating a capitalistic free market economy. Kautilya requires that the land sale be staggered and grants certain buyers automatic "call rights". The Arthashastra states that if someone wants to sell land, the owner's kins, neighbors and creditors have first right of purchase in that order, and only if they do not wish to buy the land for a fair competitive price, others and strangers can bid to buy. Further, the price must be announced in front of witnesses, recorded and taxes paid, for the buy-sale arrangement to deemed recognized by the state. The "call rights" and staggered bid buying is not truly a free market, as Trautmann points out.

The text dedicates Book 3 and 4 to economic laws and a court system to oversee and resolve economic, contracts and market-related disputes. The text also provides a system of appeal in which three dharmastha (judges) consider contractual disputes between two parties, and considers profiteering and false claims to dupe customers a crime. The text, states Trautmann, thus anticipates market exchange and provides a framework for its functioning.

=== Book on strategy anticipating all scenarios ===
Arthashastra and state

We should never forget that the Arthashastra means by the "state" an order of society which is not created by the king or the people, but which they exist to secure. These authors regarded the "state" – if that word might be used here – as essentially a beneficial institution for protection of human life and welfare and for the better realization of the ideals of humanity.

— Jan Gonda

More recent scholarship presents a more nuanced reception for the text.

The text, states Sihag, is a treatise on how a state should pursue economic development and it emphasized "proper measurement of economic performance", and "the role of ethics, considering ethical values as the glue which binds society and promotes economic development".

=== Realism ===
India's former National Security Adviser, Shiv Shankar Menon, states: "Arthashastra is a serious manual on statecraft, on how to run a state, informed by a higher purpose, clear and precise in its prescriptions, the result of practical experience of running a state. It is not just a normative text but a realist description of the art of running a state". The text is useful, according to Menon, because in many ways "the world we face today is similar to the world that Kautilya operated in". He recommended reading of the book for broadening the vision on strategic issues.

== In popular culture ==
- Mentioned in season 5 episode 22 of the TV show Blue Bloods
- Mentioned in season 3 Episode 1 of the TV show iZombie
- The novel Chanakya's Chant by Ashwin Sanghi
- The novel Blowback by Brad Thor
- Mentioned in Chandragupta Maurya (Hindi TV series telecast on Sony Entertainment Television)
- Telugu Movie Chanakya Chandragupta
- Mentioned in season 3 episode 5 of the TV show Dear White People
- Mentioned in the book World Order by Henry Kissinger
- Subject of a BBC "In Our Time" podcast The Arthashastra.

== See also ==
- Artha and Purushartha – Indian philosophical concepts
- Hindu philosophy
- History of espionage
- Dharmanomics
- Matsya Nyaya
- Nitisara
- Rajamandala
- Republic (Plato)
- Tirukkural
- Manusmriti
- Politics (Aristotle)

== Sources ==
- Bhandarkar, D. R. (1926). "Date of Kautalya". Annals of the Bhandarkar Oriental Research Institute. 7 (1/2): 65–84. JSTOR 44082682.
- Boesche, Roger (2002). The First Great Political Realist: Kautilya and His Arthashastra. Lexington. ISBN 9780739106075.
- Burrow, T. (1968). "Canakya and Kautilya". Annals of the Bhandarkar Oriental Research Institute: 17–31. JSTOR 41694220.
- Coningham, Robin; Young, Ruth (2015). The Archaeology of South Asia: From the Indus to Asoka, c.6500 BCE–200 CE. Cambridge University Press. ISBN 978-1-316-41898-7.
- Davis, Richard (2015). "Patrick Olivelle, trans. King, Governance, and Law in Ancient India: Kauṭilya's Arthaśāstra. Book review". H-Net Reviews in the Humanities & Social Sciences.
- Hansen, Valerie (2012). The Silk Road: A New History. Oxford University Press.
- Kane, P. V. (1926). "The Artheshastra of Kautilya". Annals of the Bhandarkar Oriental Research Institute. JSTOR 44082683.
- Kangle, R. P. (1965). Kautilya Arthashastra, Part III. Motilal Banarsidass (Reprinted 2010). ISBN 978-8120800410.
- Langlois-Berthelot, Jean (2013). "King, Governance, and Law in Ancient India: book review". Strategic Analysis. doi:10.1080/09700161.2013.847135.
- Mabbett, I. W. (1964). "The Date of the Arthaśāstra". Journal of the American Oriental Society. 84 (2): 162–169. doi:10.2307/597102. JSTOR 597102.
- McClish, Mark Richard (2009). Political Brahmanism and the State: A Compositional History of the Arthaśāstra. The University of Texas at Austin.
- McClish, M. (1 January 2014). "The dependence of Manu's seventh chapter on Kautilya's Arthas̈astra". Journal of the American Oriental Society. 134 (2): 241–262. doi:10.7817/jameroriesoci.134.2.241. ISSN 0003-0279. JSTOR 10.7817/jameroriesoci.134.2.241. OCLC 5713382377.
- McClish, Mark (2019). The History of the Arthasastra. Cambridge University Press.
- McLean, Iain; McMillan, Alistair (2003). The concise Oxford dictionary of politics. Oxford University Press. ISBN 978-0-19-280276-7.
- Mukherjee, S. (2017). "King, Governance, and Law in Ancient India: Kautilya's Arthasastra. Book review". Indian Historical Review. doi:10.1177/03769836176946 (inactive 1 July 2025).
- Olivelle, Patrick (1 January 2004). "Manu and the Arthaśāstra, A Study in Śāstric Intertextuality". Journal of Indian Philosophy Journal of Indian Philosophy. 32 (2–3): 281–291. doi:10.1023/B:INDI.0000021078.31452.8a. ISSN 0022-1791. OCLC 5649173080. S2CID 170873274.
- Olivelle, Patrick; McClish, Mark (2012). The Arthaśāstra selections from the classic Indian work on statecraft. Hackett. ISBN 978-1603848480. OCLC 934713097.
- Olivelle, Patrick (2013), King, Governance, and Law in Ancient India: Kauṭilya's Arthaśāstra, Oxford UK: Oxford University Press, ISBN 978-0199891825
- Petrocchi, Allessandra (2017). "The Coinage System in the Arthasastra and Commentarial Strategies in the Canakyatıka by Bhiksu Prabhamati: Issues on the Textual Authority of Manu's Code". Journal of the Royal Asiatic Society. Series 3. 27 (3): 477–500. doi:10.1017/S1356186317000050. ProQuest 1904025127.
- Rangarajan, L.N. (1992), Kautilya: The Arthashastra, Penguin Classics, ISBN 0-14-044603-6
- Rangarajan, L.N. (2016), Kautilya: The Arthashastra, Penguin Random House India, ISBN 978-0-140-44603-6
- Rao, Velcheru; Subrahmanyam, Sanjay (2013), "Notes on Political Thought in Medieval and Early Modern South India", in Richard M. Eaton; Munis D. Faruqui; David Gilmartin; Sunil Kumar (eds.), Expanding Frontiers in South Asian and World History: Essays in Honour of John F. Richards, Cambridge University Press, pp. 164–199, ISBN 978-1-107-03428-0
- Ray, Michael (2024). "Arthshastra". Encyclopedia Britannica.
- Scharfe, Hartmut (1968). Untersuchungen zur Staatsrechtslehre des Kautalya. Wiesbaden: Harrassowitz.
- Shamasastry, R. (1909). Kautilya's Arthashastra.
- Siva Kumar, N.; Rao, U. S. (1996). "Guidelines for value based management in Kautilya's Arthashastra". Journal of Business Ethics. 15 (4): 415–423. doi:10.1007/BF00380362. S2CID 153463180.
- Schlingloff, Dieter (1965). "Arthaśāstra-Studien I, Kauṭilya und Medhātithi". Wiener Zeitschrift für die Kunde Süd- und Ostasiens 9 (Wien 1965) 1–38.
- Schlingloff, Dieter (1967). "Arthaśāstra-Studien II, Die Anlage einer Festung (durgavidhāna)". Wiener Zeitschrift für die Kunde Süd- und Ostasiens. 11: 44–80.
- Schlingloff, Dieter (1969). Die altindische Stadt, Eine vergleichende Untersuchung. Wiesbaden: Steiner Verlag (Akademie der Wissenschaften und der Literatur, Mainz, Abhandlungen der Geistes- und Sozialwissenschaftlichen Klasse, 1969, 5).
- Schlingloff, Dieter (2012). Fortified Cities of Ancient India. Anthem Press.
- Trautmann, Thomas R. (1971), Kauṭilya and the Arthaśāstra: A Statistical Investigation of the Authorship and Evolution of the Text, Leiden: E.J. Brill
- Trautmann, Thomas R. (2016). Arthashastra: The Science of Wealth. Penguin UK.
