= History of political thought =

The history of political thought encompasses the chronology and the substantive and methodological changes of human political thought. The study of the history of political thought represents an intersection of various academic disciplines, such as philosophy, law, history and political science.

Many histories of Western political thought trace its origins to ancient Greece (specifically to Athenian democracy and Ancient Greek philosophy). The political philosophy of thinkers such as Socrates, Plato, and Aristotle are traditionally elevated as exceptionally important and influential in such works.

Non-Western traditions and histories of political thought have, by comparison, often been underrepresented in academic research. Such non-Western traditions of political thought have been identified, among others, in ancient China (specifically in the form of early Chinese philosophy), and in ancient India (where the Arthashastra represents an early treatise on governance and politics). Another notable non-Western school of political thought emerged in the 7th century, when the spread of Islam rapidly expanded the outreach of Islamic political philosophy.

The study of the history of political thought has inspired academic journals, and has been furthered by university programs.

== Ancient political thought ==
=== China ===
"If your desire is for good, the people will be good. The moral character of the ruler is the wind; the moral character of those beneath him is the grass. When the wind blows, the grass bends."

— Confucius, Analects 12.19

From around 770 BCE, China began to experience a time of peace and prosperity, which allowed the rise of the so-called Hundred Schools of Thought, the most influential of which was that of Confucius. His thinking was firmly based in traditional Chinese worldview, which saw the values of loyalty, duty, and respect as paramount. He believed that people and society can be improved by reciprocal treatment through moral example set by a leader embodying these virtues, as society would then respond to such good leaders by emulating them. He encapsulated this by saying that:

For this to work, however, society had to be ordered hierarchically, modeled after the patriarchal family. and headed by an absolute sovereign. However, Confucius also believed the state should employ a meritocratic class of administrators and advisers, recruited by civil service exams. Among later Chinese thinkers, Mozi agreed with his ideas of meritocracy and leading by example, but opposed the family-model of governance with the belief that it would be nepotistic. Mencius, however, championed his ideas later on. Taoism, another school of thought, advocated a proto-anarchism. An alternative Chinese philosophy called Legalism argued that instead of virtue, authoritarian discipline was crucial for the governance of the state. It was the dominant political philosophy of the Qin dynasty, but was replaced by State Confucianism in the Han dynasty. Each had religious or mythic aspects as well that played into how they viewed fairness in governance.

Prior to China's adoption of communism, State Confucianism remained the dominant political philosophy of China up to the 20th century.

=== India ===
Indian political philosophy in ancient times demarcated a clear distinction between (1) nation and state (2) religion and state. The constitutions of Hindu states evolved over time and were based on political and legal treatises and prevalent social institutions. The institutions of state were broadly divided into governance, diplomacy, administration, defense, law and order. Mantranga, the principal governing body of these states, consisted of the King, Prime Minister, Commander in chief of army, and Chief Priest of the King. The Prime Minister headed the committee of ministers along with head of executive (Maha Amatya).

Chanakya was a 4th-century BC Indian political philosopher. The Arthashastra provides an account of the science of politics for a wise ruler, policies for foreign affairs and wars, the system of a spy state and surveillance and economic stability of the state. Chanakya quotes several authorities including Bruhaspati, Ushanas, Prachetasa Manu, Parasara, and Ambi, and described himself as a descendant of a lineage of political philosophers, with his father Chanaka being his immediate predecessor. Another influential extant Indian treatise on political philosophy is the Sukra Neeti. An example of a code of law in ancient India is the Manusmṛti or Laws of Manu. Chanakya also offered practical advice on how to run government. He also believed that virtue in the leader and the merit of their advisers were important. Furthermore, he also argued that the end justifies the means, and that after using the best means available to defeat their enemies, rulers should "substitute [their] virtues for the defeated enemy's vices, and where the enemy was good [they] shall be twice as good". Prior to him, Manu wrote about similar topics in his Manusmriti.

=== Greece ===
The origins of European political thought are in ancient Rome and Greece. Starting in approximately 600 BCE, thinkers in these societies began to consider questions of how to organize societies, as part of their more broad considerations of ethics and how to live the good life.

In the intellectual golden age of the fifth-century Athenian democracy, Plato had the freedom to develop his ideas, although he nevertheless despised democracy, alongside all other then existing form of government. This was because Plato believed that the state should promote the virtues necessary for good living, but thought the existing political arrangements of monarchy, oligarchy, and democracy all promoted the interests of the people in power, who were ignorant of those virtues, and instead would only pursue honour and wealth, leading to conflict and injustice. To correct this, Plato proposed in the Republic for philosopher kings, who would know how to achieve the good life, to be in power instead. Plato's student Aristotle contributed to political philosophy in works such as Nicomachean Ethics and Politics. Aristotle is notable for the theories that humans are social animals, and that the polis (Ancient Greek city state) existed to bring about the good life appropriate to such animals. Roman political philosophy was influenced by the Stoics and the Roman statesman Cicero.

== Post-classical political thought ==
=== Europe ===
Medieval political philosophy in Europe was heavily influenced by Christian thinking. It had much in common with the Mutazilite Islamic thinking in that the Roman Catholics thought subordinating philosophy to theology did not subject reason to revelation but in the case of contradictions, subordinated reason to faith as the Asharite of Islam. The Scholastics by combining the philosophy of Aristotle with the Christianity of St. Augustine emphasized the potential harmony inherent in reason and revelation. Scholastic political philosophy dominated European thought for centuries even unto the Renaissance.

Some medieval political philosophers, such as Aquinas in his Summa Theologica, developed the idea that a king who is a tyrant is no king at all and could be overthrown. Others, like Nicole Oresme in his Livre de Politiques, categorically denied this right to overthrow an unjust ruler. Magna Carta, viewed by many as a cornerstone of Anglo-American political liberty, explicitly proposes the right to revolt against the ruler for justice's sake. Other documents similar to Magna Carta are found in other European countries such as Spain and Hungary.

==== Saint Augustine ====
The early Christian philosophy of Augustine of Hippo was heavily influenced by Plato. A key change brought about by Christian thought was the moderation of the Stoicism and theory of justice of the Roman world, as well emphasis on the role of the state in applying mercy as a moral example. Augustine also preached that one was not a member of his or her city, but was either a citizen of the City of God (Civitas Dei) or the Earthly City (Civitas Terrena). Augustine's City of God is an influential work of this period that attacked the thesis, held by many Christian Romans, that the Christian view could be realized on Earth.

==== St. Thomas Aquinas ====
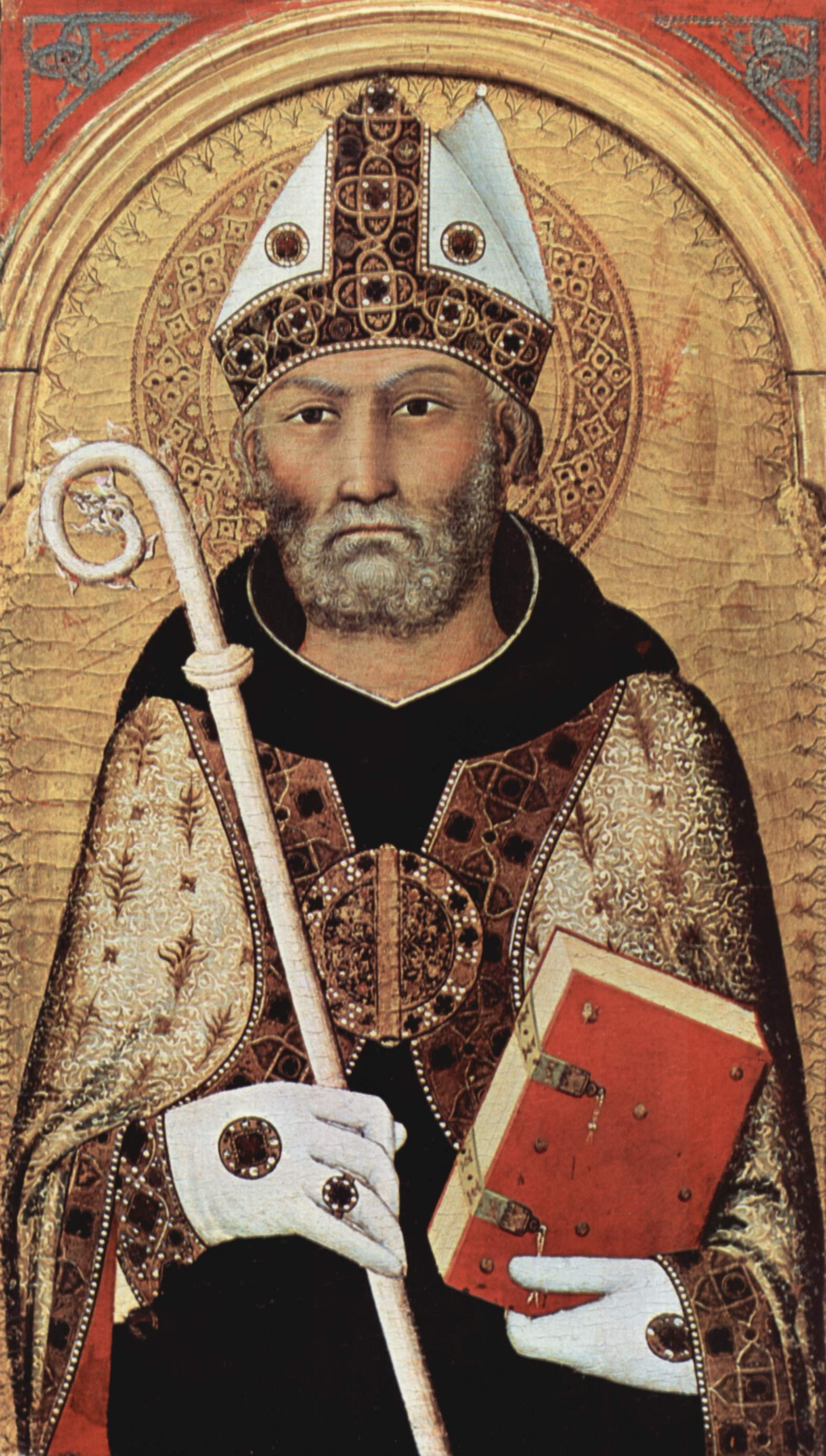
Augustine of Hippo

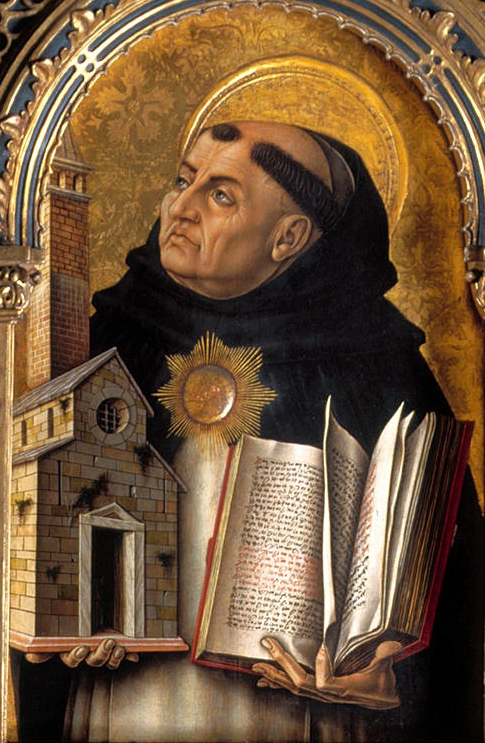
Thomas Aquinas

Perhaps the most influential political philosopher of medieval Europe was St. Thomas Aquinas who helped reintroduce Aristotle's works, which had only been transmitted to Catholic Europe through Muslim Spain, along with the commentaries of Averroes. Aquinas meticulously dealt with the varieties of philosophy of law. According to Aquinas, there are four kinds of law:

1. Eternal law ("the divine government of everything")
2. Divine positive law (having been "posited" by God; external to human nature)
3. Natural law (the right way of living discoverable by natural reason; what cannot-not be known; internal to human nature)
4. Human law (what we commonly call "law"—including customary law; the law of the Communitas Perfecta)

Aquinas never discusses the nature or categorization of canon law. There is scholarly debate surrounding the place of canon law within the Thomistic jurisprudential framework. Aquinas was an incredibly influential thinker in the Natural Law tradition.

In synthesizing Christian theology and Peripatetic (Aristotelian) teaching in his Treatise on Law, Aquinas contends that God's gift of higher reason—manifest in human law by way of the divine virtues—gives way to the assembly of righteous government.

=== Islamic World ===
==== Mutazilite vs. Asharite ====
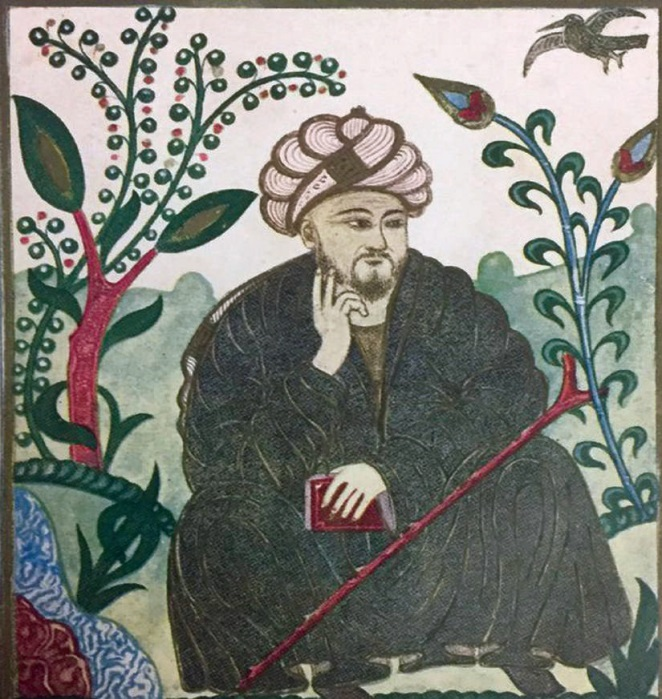
Al Farabi

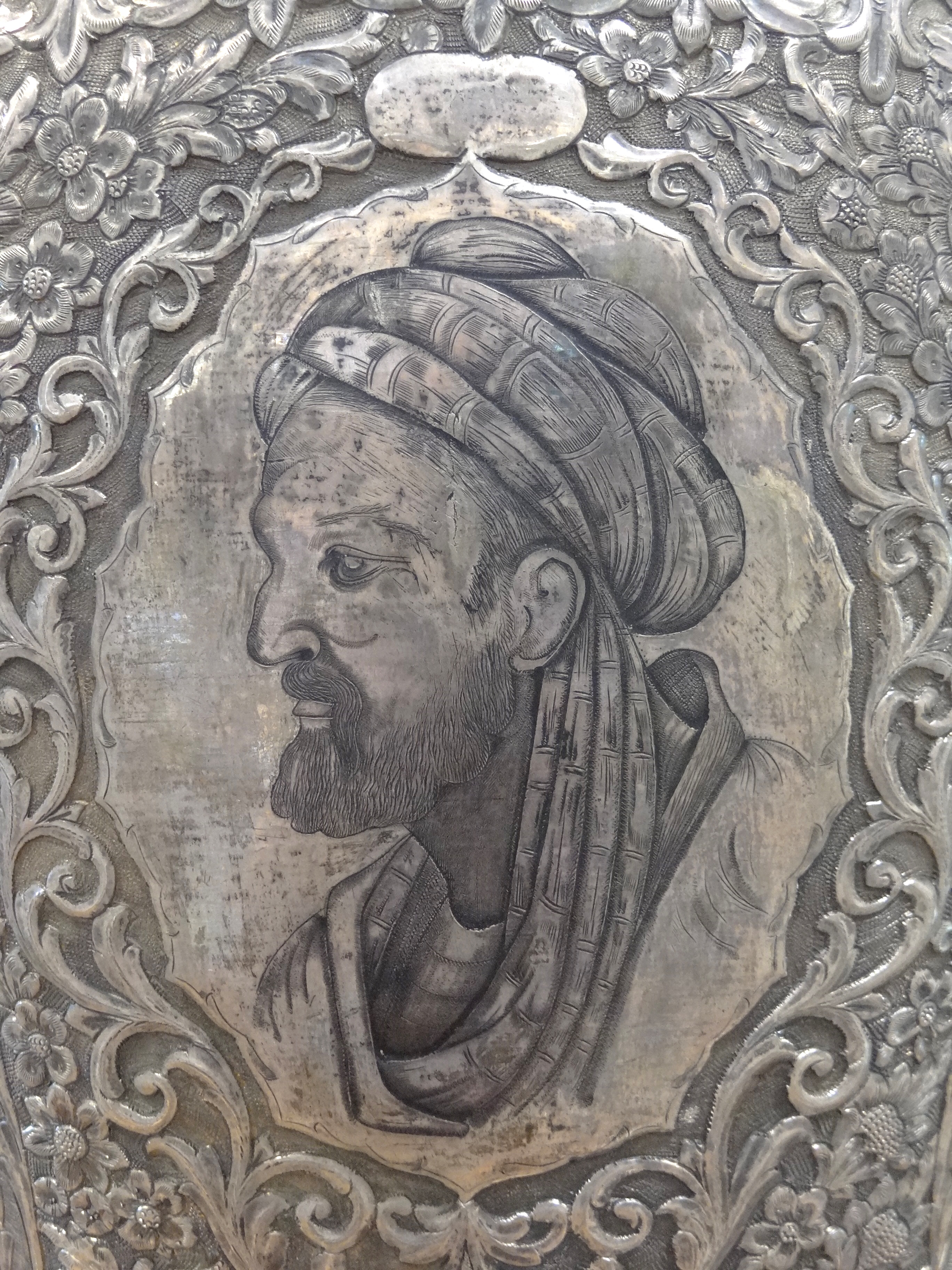
Ibn Sina

The rise of Islam, based on both the Qur'an and Muhammad strongly altered the power balances and perceptions of origin of power in the Mediterranean region. Early Islamic philosophy emphasized an inexorable link between science and religion, and the process of ijtihad to find truth—in effect all philosophy was "political" as it had real implications for governance. This view was challenged by the "rationalist" Mutazilite philosophers, who held a more Hellenic view, reason above revelation, and as such are known to modern scholars as the first speculative theologians of Islam; they were supported by a secular aristocracy who sought freedom of action independent of the Caliphate. By the late ancient period, however, the "traditionalist" Asharite view of Islam had in general triumphed. According to the Asharites, reason must be subordinate to the Quran and the Sunna.

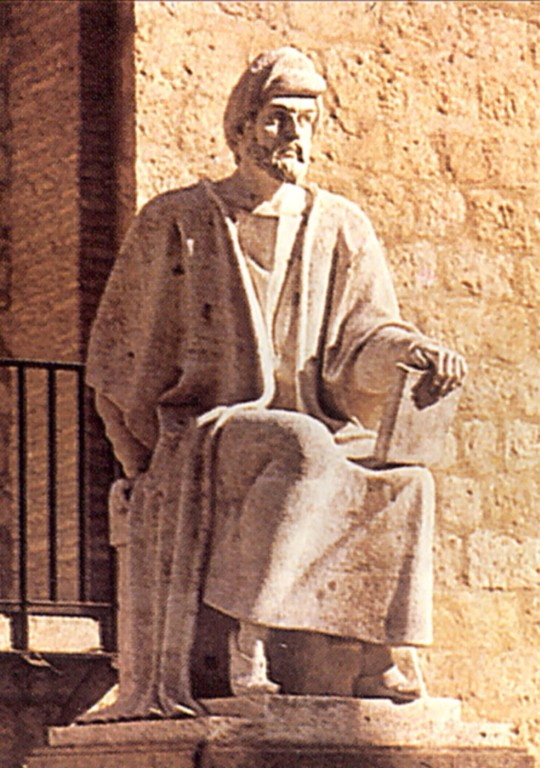
Ibn Rushd

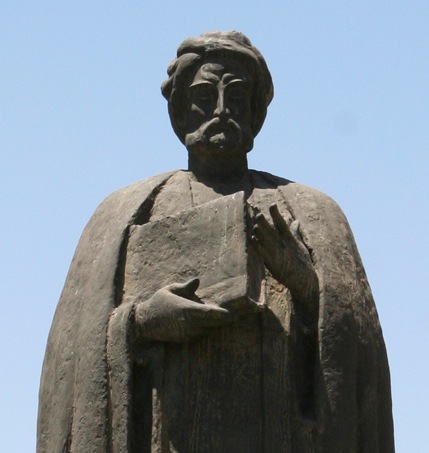
Ibn Khaldun

Islamic political philosophy, was, indeed, rooted in the very sources of Islam—i.e., the Qur'an and the Sunnah, the words and practices of Muhammad—thus making it essentially theocratic. However, in Western thought, it is generally supposed that it was a specific area peculiar merely to the great philosophers of Islam: al-Kindi (Alkindus), al-Farabi (Abunaser), İbn Sina (Avicenna), Ibn Bajjah (Avempace) and Ibn Rushd (Averroes). The political conceptions of Islam such as kudrah (power), sultan, ummah, cemaa (obligation)-and even the "core" terms of the Qur'an—i.e., ibadah (worship), din (religion), rab (master) and ilah (deity)—is taken as the basis of an analysis. Hence, not only the ideas of the Muslim political philosophers but also many other jurists and ulama posed political ideas and theories. For example, the ideas of the Khawarij in the very early years of Islamic history on Khilafa and Ummah, or that of Shia Islam on the concept of Imamah are considered proofs of political thought. The clashes between the Ehl-i Sunna and Shia in the 7th and 8th centuries had a genuine political character. Political thought was not purely rooted in theism, however. Aristotelianism flourished as the Islamic Golden Age saw rise to a continuation of the peripatetic philosophers who implemented the ideas of Aristotle in the context of the Islamic world. Abunaser, Avicenna and Ibn Rushd where part of this philosophical school who claimed that human reason surpassed mere coincidence and revelation. They believed, for example, that natural phenomena occur because of certain rules (made by god), not because god interfered directly (unlike Al-Ghazali and his followers).

Other notable political philosophers of the time include Nizam al-Mulk, a Persian scholar and vizier of the Seljuq Empire who composed the Siyasatnama, or the "Book of Government" in English. In it, he details the role of the state in terms of political affairs (i.e. how to deal with political opponents without ruining the government's image), as well as its duty to protect the poor and reward the worthy. In his other work, he explains how the state should deal with other issues such as supplying jobs to immigrants like the Turkmens who were coming from the north (present day southern Russia, Kazakhstan, Turkmenistan and Uzbekistan).

==== Ibn Khaldun ====
The 14th-century Arab scholar Ibn Khaldun is considered one of the greatest political theorists. The British philosopher-anthropologist Ernest Gellner considered Ibn Khaldun's definition of government, "...an institution which prevents injustice other than such as it commits itself", the best in the history of political theory. For Ibn Khaldun, government should be restrained to a minimum for as a necessary evil, it is the constraint of men by other men.

== Modern political thought ==
=== Renaissance ===
Niccolò Machiavelli

During the Renaissance secular political philosophy began to emerge after about a century of theological political thought in Europe. One of the most influential works during this burgeoning period was Niccolò Machiavelli's The Prince, written around 1513 and published posthumously in 1532, after Machiavelli's death. That work, as well as The Discourses, a rigorous analysis of classical antiquity, did much to influence modern political thought in the West. Though the work was written for the Medici family in order to perhaps influence them to free him from exile, Machiavelli supported the Republic of Florence rather than the principate of the Medici family. At any rate, Machiavelli presents a rather novel and controversial view of politics, whereby the acquisition and maintenance of absolute royal power are determined by a prince's ability to forgo the moral virtues. His other major work, The Discourses on Livy, focused mainly on republican statecraft, and his recommendations for a well-ordered republic. Machiavelli noted how free republics have power structures that are better than principalities. He also notes how advantageous a government by a republic could be as opposed to just a single ruler. Machiavelli's more controversial statements on politics can also be found in his other works. For example, Machiavelli notes that sometimes extraordinary means, such as violence, can be used in re-ordering a corrupt city. In one area, he excuses the actions of Romulus, who murdered his brother and co-ruler in order to have power by himself to found the city of Rome with laws fit for a free society. Thomas Hobbes, well known for his theory of the social contract, goes on to expand this view at the start of the 17th century during the English Renaissance.

John Locke in particular exemplified this new age of political theory with his work Two Treatises of Government. In it Locke proposes a state-of-nature theory that directly complements his conception of how political development occurs and how it can be founded through contractual obligation. Locke stood to refute Sir Robert Filmer's paternally founded political theory in favor of a natural system based on nature in a particular given system.

=== Age of Enlightenment ===
Eugène Delacroix's Liberty Leading the People (1830, Louvre), a painting created at a time where old and modern political philosophies came into violent conflict

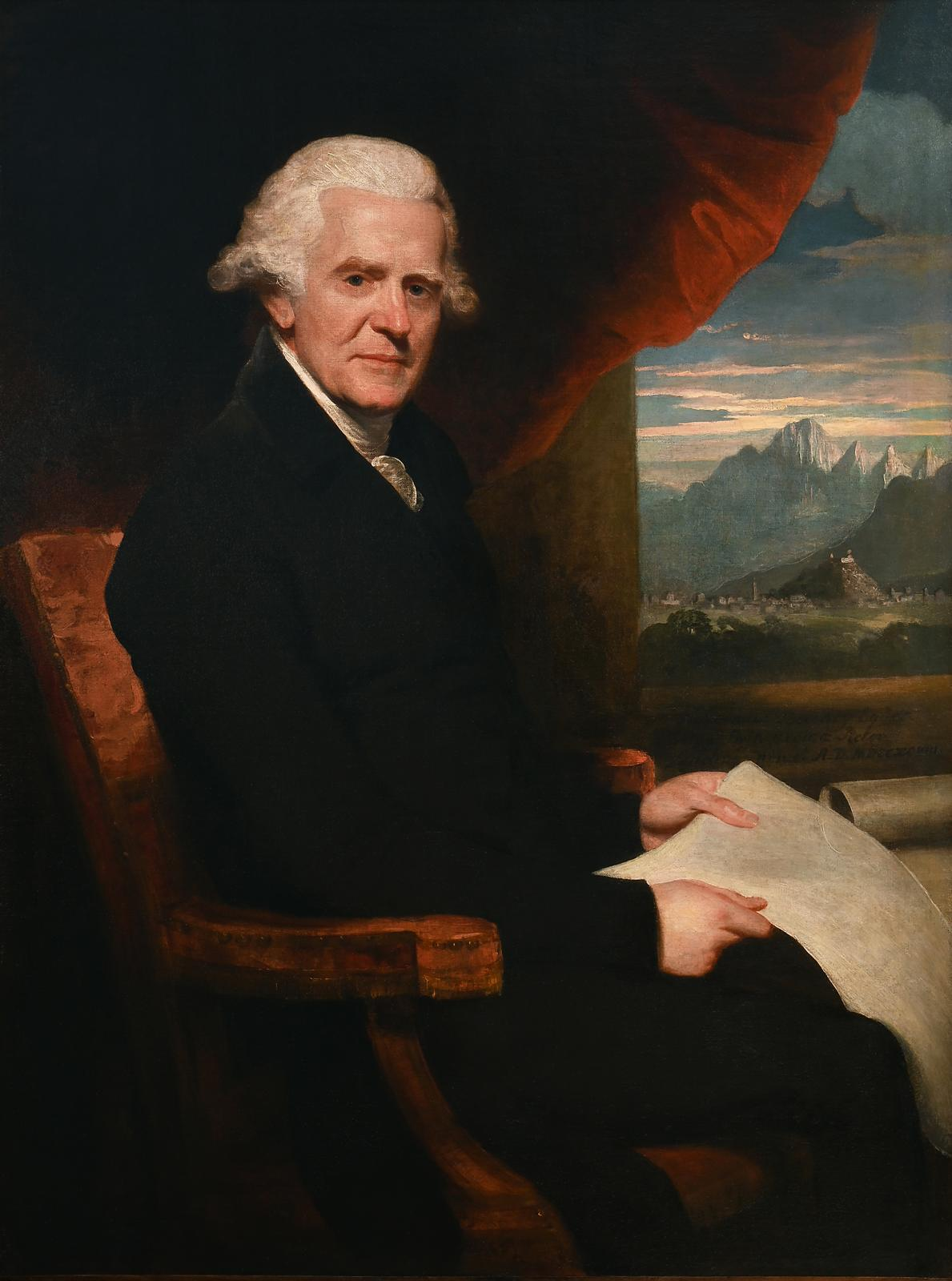
Portrait of Pasquale Paoli by Sir William Beechey

During the Enlightenment period, new theories emerged about what the human was and is and about the definition of reality and the way it was perceived, along with the discovery of other societies in the Americas, and the changing needs of political societies (especially in the wake of the English Civil War, the American Revolution, the French Revolution, and the Haitian Revolution). These new theories led to new questions and insights by thinkers such as Thomas Hobbes, John Locke, Benjamin Constant and Jean-Jacques Rousseau.

These theorists were driven by two basic questions: one, by what right or need do people form states; and two, what the best form for a state could be. These fundamental questions involved a conceptual distinction between the concepts of "state" and "government." It was decided that "state" would refer to a set of enduring institutions through which power would be distributed and its use justified. The term "government" would refer to a specific group of people who occupied the institutions of the state, and create the laws and ordinances by which the people, themselves included, would be bound. This conceptual distinction continues to operate in political science, although some political scientists, philosophers, historians and cultural anthropologists have argued that most political action in any given society occurs outside of its state, and that there are societies that are not organized into states that nevertheless must be considered in political terms. As long as the concept of natural order was not introduced, the social sciences could not evolve independently of theistic thinking. Since the cultural revolution of the 17th century in England, which spread to France and the rest of Europe, society has been considered subject to natural laws akin to the physical world.

Political and economic relations were drastically influenced by these theories as the concept of the guild was subordinated to the theory of free trade, and Roman Catholic dominance of theology was increasingly challenged by Protestant churches subordinate to each nation-state, which also (in a fashion the Roman Catholic Church often decried angrily) preached in the vulgar or native language of each region. Free trade, as opposed to these religious theories, is a trade policy that does not restrict imports or exports. It can also be understood as the free market idea applied to international trade. In government, free trade is predominantly advocated by political parties that hold liberal economic positions while economically left-wing and nationalist political parties generally support protectionism, the opposite of free trade. However, the enlightenment was an outright attack on religion, particularly Christianity. The most outspoken critic of the church in France was François Marie Arouet de Voltaire, a representative figure of the enlightenment.

Historians have described Voltaire's description of the history of Christianity as "propagandistic". Voltaire is partially responsible for the misattribution of the expression Credo quia absurdum to the Church Fathers. In a letter to Frederick II, King of Prussia, dated 5 January 1767, he wrote about Christianity: La nôtre [religion] est sans contredit la plus ridicule, la plus absurde, et la plus sanguinaire qui ait jamais infecté le monde. "Ours [i.e., the Christian religion] is assuredly the most ridiculous, the most absurd and the most bloody religion which has ever infected this world. Your Majesty will do the human race an eternal service by extirpating this infamous superstition, I do not say among the rabble, who are not worthy of being enlightened and who are apt for every yoke; I say among honest people, among men who think, among those who wish to think. ... My one regret in dying is that I cannot aid you in this noble enterprise, the finest and most respectable which the human mind can point out." After Voltaire, religion would never be the same again in France.

==== John Locke ====
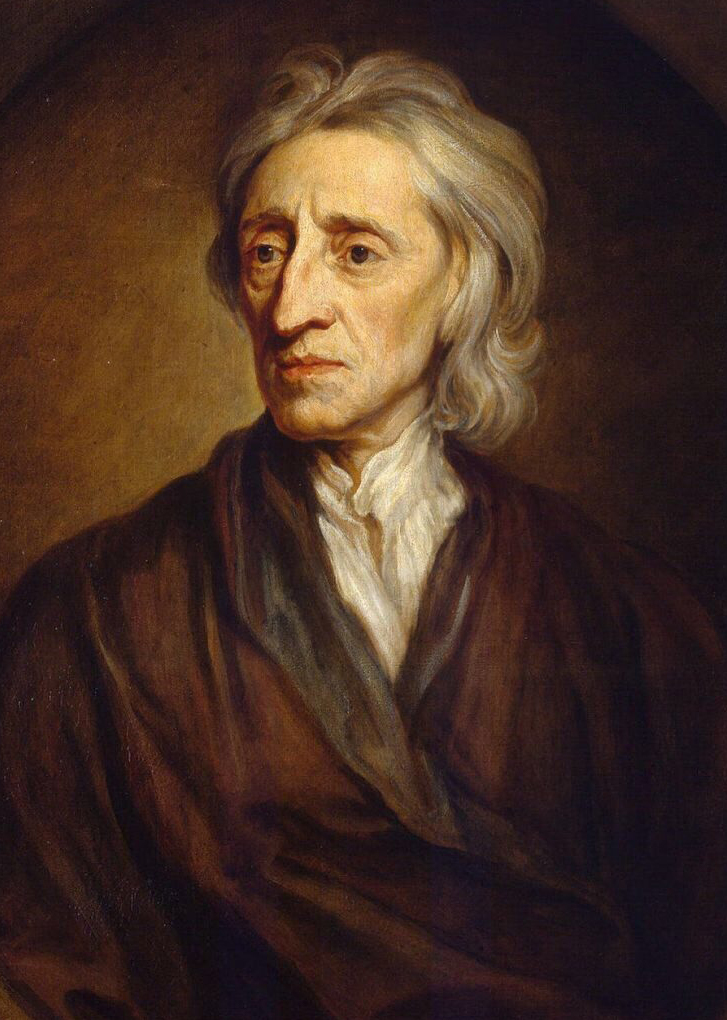
John Locke

John Locke in particular exemplified this new age of political theory with his work Two Treatises of Government. In it, Locke proposes a state of nature theory that directly complements his conception of how political development occurs and how it can be founded through contractual obligation. Locke stood to refute Sir Robert Filmer's paternally founded political theory in favor of a natural system based on nature in a particular given system. In the Two Treatises of Government, Locke argued against Filmer's defense of patriarchal monarchy and hereditary political authority. He claimed, instead, that legitimate government rested upon the consent of the governed. Unlike Machiavelli and Hobbes but like Aquinas, Locke would accept Aristotle's dictum that man seeks to be happy in a state of social harmony as a social animal. Unlike Aquinas's preponderant view on the salvation of the soul from original sin, Locke believes man's mind comes into this world as tabula rasa. For Locke, knowledge is neither innate, revealed nor based on authority but subject to uncertainty tempered by reason, tolerance and moderation. According to Locke, an absolute ruler as proposed by Hobbes is unnecessary, for natural law is based on reason and seeking peace and survival for man.

==== David Hume ====
David Hume criticized the social contract theory of John Locke and others as resting on a myth of some actual agreement. Hume was a realist in recognizing the role of force to forge the existence of states and that consent of the governed was merely hypothetical. He also introduced the concept of utility, later picked up on and developed by Jeremy Bentham. Hume also coined the is–ought problem, i.e. that just because something is does not mean that is how it ought to be, which was a very influential idea on normative politics.

==== Adam Smith ====
Known as the father of liberalism, Adam Smith explained emergence of economic benefits from the self-interested behavior (the invisible hand) of artisans and traders. While praising its efficiency, Smith also expressed concern about the effects of industrial labor (e.g., repetitive activity) on workers. His work on moral sentiments sought to explain social bonds which enhance economic activity.

==== Immanuel Kant ====
Immanuel Kant argued that participation in civil society is undertaken not for self-preservation, as per Thomas Hobbes, but as a moral duty. He was the first modern thinker who fully analyzed structure and meaning of obligation. He also argued that an international organization was needed to preserve world peace.

==== John Stuart Mill ====
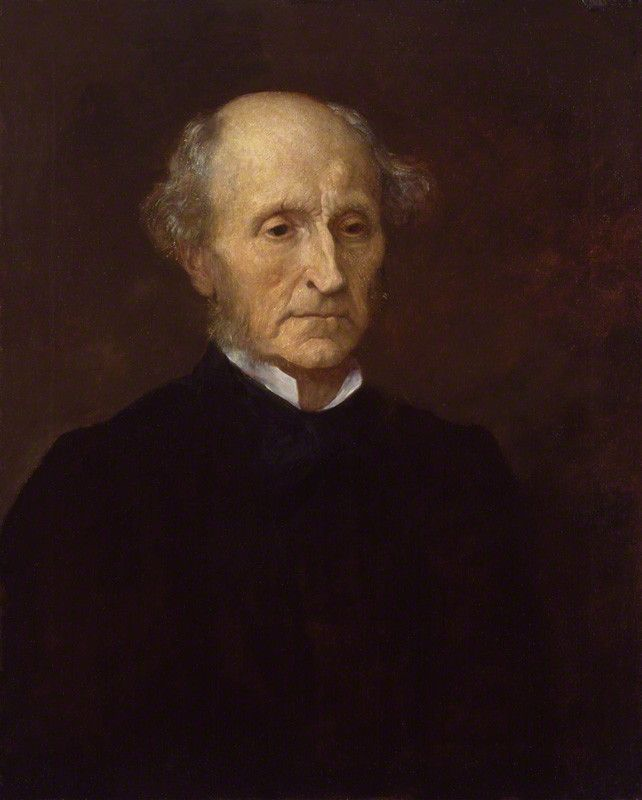
John Stuart Mill

John Stuart Mill's work on political philosophy begins in On Liberty, the most influential statement of his liberal principles. He begins by distinguishing old and new threats to liberty. The old threat to liberty is found in traditional societies in which there is rule by one (a monarchy) or a few (an aristocracy). Though one could be worried about restrictions on liberty by benevolent monarchs or aristocrats, the traditional worry is that when rulers are politically unaccountable to the governed they will rule in their own interests, rather than the interests of the governed. Mill's explicit theory of rights is introduced in Chapter V of Utilitarianism in the context of his sanction theory of duty, which is an indirect form of utilitarianism that identifies wrong actions as actions that it is useful to sanction. Mill then introduces justice as a proper part of the duty. Justice involves duties that are perfect duties—that is, duties that are correlated with rights. Justice implies something which it is not only right to do, and wrong not to do, but which some individual person can claim from us as a matter of right. These perfect duties will thus create liberty and collective freedom within a state. He uses, On Liberty to discuss gender equality in society. To Mill, Utilitarianism was the perfect tool to justify gender equality in The Subjection of Women, referring to the political, lawful and social subjection of women. When a woman was married, she entered legally binding coverture with her husband; once she married her legal existence as an individual was suspended under "marital unity". While it is easy to presume that a woman would not marry under these circumstances, being unmarried had social consequences. A woman could only advance in social stature and wealth if she had a rich husband to do the groundwork. Mill uses his Utilitarian ethics to assess how gender equality would be the best way to achieve "the greatest good for the greatest number" : "The principle that regulates the existing social relations between the two sexes … and is now one of the chief obstacles to human improvement…"

The 'chief obstacle' to Mill relates to women's intellectual capability. The Subjection of Women looks at this in the women of society and argues that diminishing their intellectual potential wastes the knowledge and skill of half of the population; such knowledge lost could formulate ideas that could maximize pleasure for society.

==== James Madison ====
James Madison was an American politician considered to be "Father of the Constitution" and "Father of the Bill of Rights" of the United States. As a political theorist, he believed in separation of powers and proposed a comprehensive set of checks and balances that are necessary to protect the rights of an individual from the tyranny of the majority.

==== Thomas Paine ====
Thomas Paine defended liberal democracy, the American Revolution, and the French Revolution in Common Sense and The Rights of Man.

==== Benjamin Constant ====
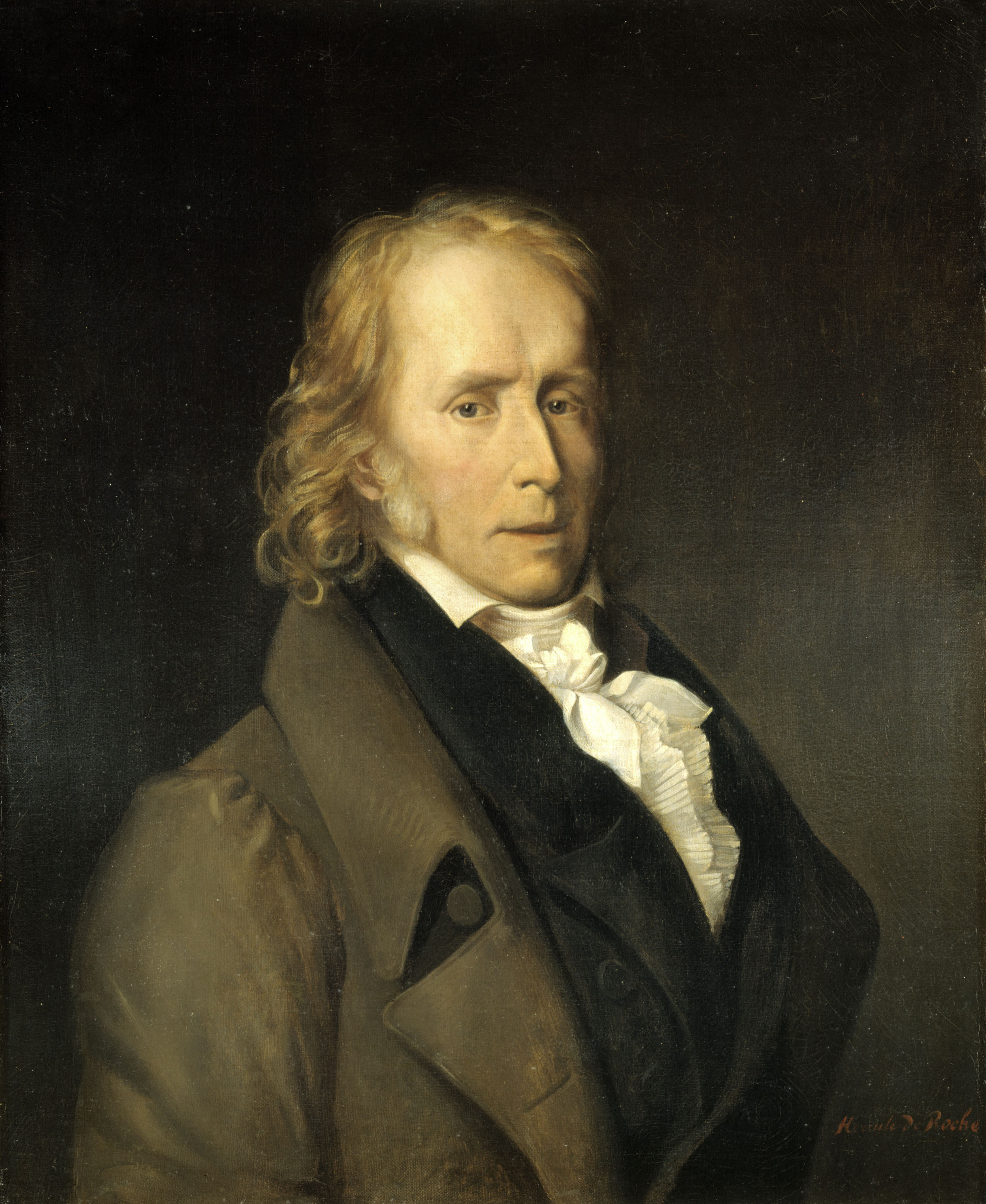
Portrait of Constant c. 1820

One of the first thinkers to go by the name of "liberal", Benjamin Constant looked to Britain rather than to ancient Rome for a practical model of freedom in a large, commercial society. He drew a distinction between the "Liberty of the Ancients" and the "Liberty of the Moderns". The Liberty of the Ancients was participatory republican liberty, which gave the citizens the right to directly influence politics through debates and votes in the public assembly. In order to support this degree of participation, citizenship was a burdensome moral obligation requiring a considerable investment of time and energy. Generally, this required a sub-society of slaves to do much of the productive work, leaving the citizens free to deliberate on public affairs. Ancient Liberty was also limited to relatively small and homogenous societies, in which the people could be conveniently gathered together in one place to transact public affairs.

The Liberty of the Moderns, in contrast, was based on the possession of civil liberties, the rule of law, and freedom from excessive state interference. Direct participation would be limited: a necessary consequence of the size of modern states, and also the inevitable result of having created a commercial society in which there are no slaves but almost everybody must earn a living through work. Instead, the voters would elect representatives, who would deliberate in Parliament on behalf of the people and would save citizens from the necessity of daily political involvement.

Moreover, Constant believed that, in the modern world, commerce was superior to war. He attacked Napoleon's martial appetite, on the grounds that it was illiberal and no longer suited to modern commercial social organization. Ancient Liberty tended to be warlike, whereas a state organized on the principles of Modern Liberty would be at peace with all peaceful nations.

=== Romanticism ===
==== Jean-Jacques Rousseau ====
Rousseau analyzed the social contract as an expression of the general will, and controversially argued in favor of absolute democracy where the people at large would act as sovereign. The Social Contract (1762) outlines the basis for a legitimate political order within a framework of classical republicanism, becoming one of the most influential works of political philosophy in the Western tradition. It developed some of the ideas mentioned in earlier work, the article Discours sur l'oeconomie politique (Discourse on Political Economy), featured in Diderot's Encyclopédie. The treatise begins with the dramatic opening lines, "Man is born free, and everywhere he is in chains. Those who think themselves the masters of others are indeed greater slaves than they."

Rousseau claimed that the state of nature was a primitive condition without law or morality, which human beings left for the benefits and necessity of cooperation. As society developed, the division of labor and private property required the human race to adopt institutions of law. In the degenerate phase of society, man is prone to be in frequent competition with his fellow men while also becoming increasingly dependent on them. This double pressure threatens both his survival and his freedom.

==== G. W. F. Hegel ====
G. W. F. Hegel emphasized the "cunning" of history, arguing that it followed a rational trajectory, even while embodying seemingly irrational forces. Hegel influenced Marx, Kierkegaard, Nietzsche, and Oakeshott.

=== Industrialization ===
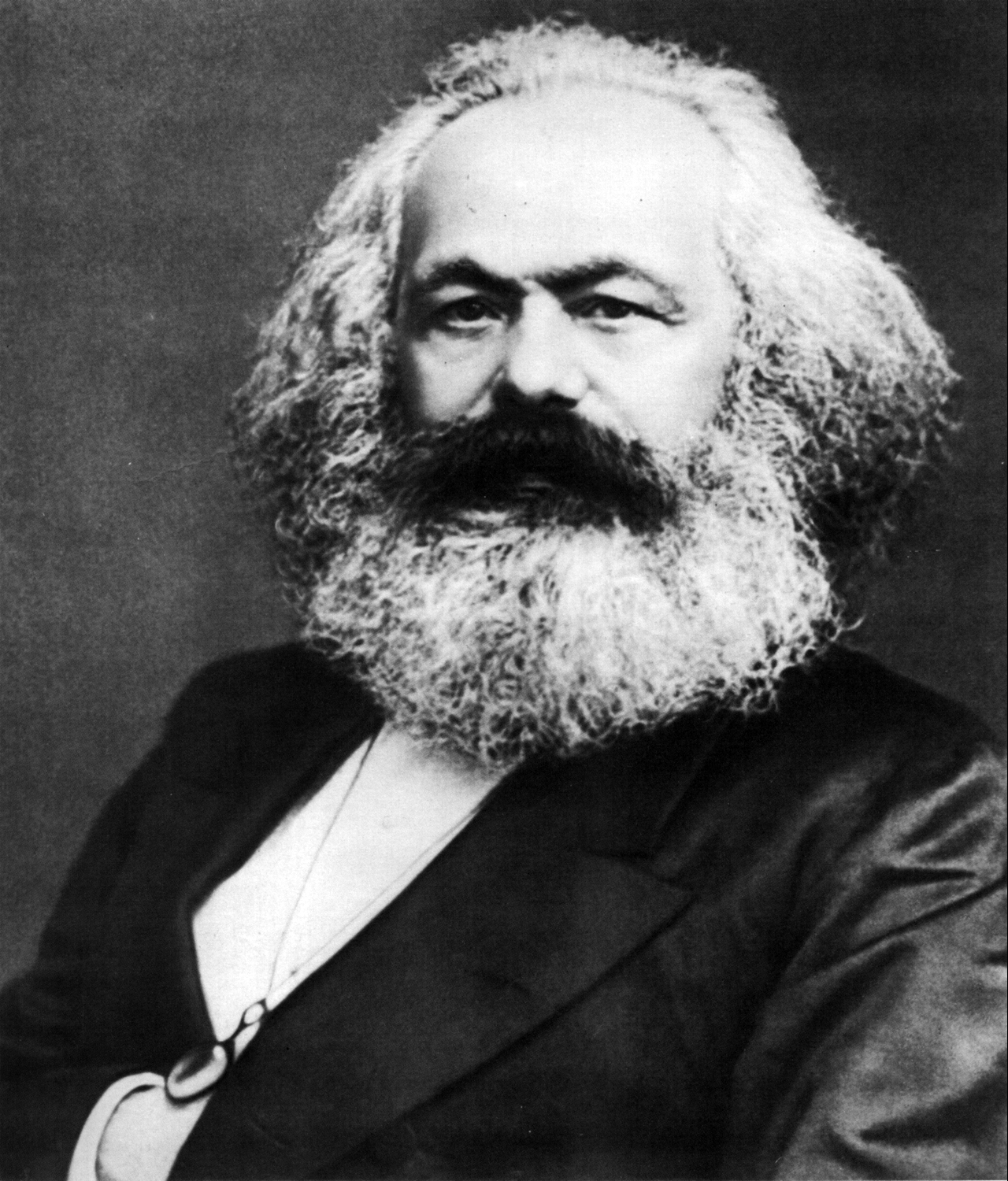
Karl Marx and his theory of Communism, developed with Friedrich Engels, proved to be one of the most influential political ideologies of the 20th century.

The Industrial Revolution changed societies dramatically. As a consequence, Karl Marx and Friedrich Engels became the first theorists of Socialism and Communism. Their ideas were further developed by Vladimir Lenin, leading to the ideology of Leninism. Under Joseph Stalin these ideas would be further developed into Marxism-Leninism and put into practice in the Soviet Union and later the Eastern Bloc. During the Cold War, this line of thought would further result in Maoism, Ho Chi Minh Thought, Hoxhaism and Titoism.

As industrialisation enabled the rise of colonialism, this was accompanied by the ideology of Imperialism. Later, anti-imperialist ideologies would counter this, such as Gandhism and Nasserism.

=== Anarchism ===
Pierre-Joseph Proudhon is commonly considered the father of modern anarchism, specifically mutualism. Peter Kropotkin is another classic anarchist thinker, who was the most influential theorist of anarcho-communism. Mikhail Bakunin's specific version of anarchism is called collectivist anarchism. Max Stirner was the main representative of the anarchist current known as individualist anarchism and the founder of ethical egoism which endorses anarchy.

Henry David Thoreau was an influential anarchist thinker writing on topics such as pacifism, environmentalism and civil disobedience – notably with his written work Civil Disobedience – who influenced later important political activists such as Leo Tolstoy, Mahatma Gandhi and Martin Luther King Jr. Hard-lining on the individual citizen's right to seek justice over the state's, he was also an outspoken advocate and apologist for John Brown following his raid on Harper's Ferry for the purpose of abolitionist efforts, writing A Plea for Captain John Brown and The Last Days of John Brown.

Noam Chomsky is a leading critic of U.S. foreign policy, neoliberalism and contemporary state capitalism, the Israeli–Palestinian conflict, and mainstream news media. His ideas have proven highly influential in the anti-capitalist and anti-imperialist movements, and aligns with anarcho-syndicalism and libertarian socialism.

=== Austrian School ===
The Austrian school is a heterodox school of economic thought that advocates strict adherence to methodological individualism, the concept that social phenomena result primarily from the motivations and actions of individuals along with their self interest. Austrian-school theorists hold that economic theory should be exclusively derived from basic principles of human action.

The Austrian school originated with the work of Carl Menger, Eugen von Böhm-Bawerk, Friedrich von Wieser, and others. Among the theoretical contributions of the early years of the Austrian school are the subjective theory of value, marginalism in price theory and the formulation of the economic calculation problem.

Friedrich Hayek argued that central planning was inefficient because members of central bodies could not know enough to match the preferences of consumers and workers with existing conditions. Hayek further argued that central economic planning—a mainstay of socialism—would lead to a "total" state with dangerous power. He advocated free-market capitalism in which the main role of the state is to maintain the rule of law and let spontaneous order develop.

An economist of the Austrian School, Murray Rothbard was the central theorist of anarcho-capitalism.

=== Christian democracy ===
Christian democracy is a centre-right ideology inspired by Christian social teaching. It originated as a reaction against the industrialisation and urbanisation associated with laissez-faire capitalism. Jacques Maritain has been recognized as the leading Christian-democratic philosopher. Key ideas in Christian-democratic thought include personalism, popularism, subsidiarity, and stewardship.

In post-war Europe, Christian-democratic parties dominated politics in several nations—the Christian People's Party in Belgium, CDU and CSU in Germany, Fine Gael and Fianna Fáil in Ireland, and Christian Democracy in Italy. Many post-war Europeans saw Christian democracy as a moderate alternative to the extremes of right-wing nationalism and left-wing communism. Christian-democratic parties were especially popular among European women, who often voted for these parties to a large extent due to their pro-family policies.

=== Communitarianism ===
Another debate developed around the (distinct) criticisms of liberal political theory made by Michael Walzer, Michael Sandel and Charles Taylor. The liberal-communitarian debate is often considered valuable for generating a new set of philosophical problems, rather than a profound and illuminating clash of perspective. These and other communitarians (such as Alasdair MacIntyre and Daniel A. Bell) argue that, contra liberalism, communities are prior to individuals and therefore should be the center of political focus. Communitarians tend to support greater local control as well as economic and social policies which encourage the growth of social capital.

=== Conservatism ===
An Irish member of the British parliament, Edmund Burke is credited with the creation of conservative thought. Burke's Reflections on the Revolution in France is the most popular of his writings where he denounced the French Revolution, although he supported the American Revolution.

An exponent of liberal conservatism, French sociologist Alexis de Tocqueville is known for his works Democracy in America and The Old Regime and the Revolution.

A German political theorist of the Conservative Revolution movement, Carl Schmitt developed the concepts of the friend/enemy distinction, the state of exception, and political theology. Though his most influential books were written in the 1920s, he continued to write prolifically until his death (in academic quasi-exile) in 1985. He heavily influenced 20th-century political philosophy.

Leo Strauss famously rejected modernity, mostly on the grounds of what he perceived to be modern political philosophy's excessive self-sufficiency of reason and flawed philosophical grounds for moral and political normativity. He argued instead that we should return to pre-modern thinkers for answers to contemporary issues. His philosophy was influential on the formation of neoconservatism, and a number of his students later were members of the Bush administration.

=== Intersectionality ===
Colonialism and racism were important issues that arose during the 1950s and 1960s. The rise of feminism, LGBT social movements and the end of colonial rule and of the political exclusion of such minorities as African Americans and sexual minorities in the developed world has led to feminist, postcolonial, and multicultural thought becoming significant. This led to a challenge to the social contract by philosophers Charles W. Mills in his book The Racial Contract and Carole Pateman in her book The Sexual Contract that the social contract excluded persons of colour and women respectively. Michel Foucault critiqued the modern conception of power on the basis of the prison complex and other prohibitive institutions, such as those that designate sexuality, madness and knowledge as the roots of their infrastructure—a critique that demonstrated that subjection is the power formation of subjects in any linguistic forum and that revolution cannot just be thought as the reversal of power between classes.

=== Marxism ===
Karl Marx's critique of capitalism—developed with Friedrich Engels—was, alongside liberalism and fascism, one of the defining ideological movements of the twentieth century. The Industrial Revolution produced a parallel revolution in political thought. Urbanization and capitalism greatly reshaped society. During this same period, the socialist movement began to form. In the mid-19th century, Marxism was developed, and socialism in general gained increasing popular support, mostly from the urban working class. Without breaking entirely from the past, Marx established principles that would be used by future revolutionaries of the 20th century, namely Vladimir Lenin, Mao Zedong, Ho Chi Minh, and Fidel Castro. Though Hegel's philosophy of history is similar to Immanuel Kant's, and Karl Marx's theory of revolution towards the common good is partly based on Kant's view of history—Marx declared that he was turning Hegel's dialectic, which was "standing on its head", "the right side up again". Unlike Marx who believed in historical materialism, Hegel believed in the Phenomenology of Spirit. The Russian Revolution of 1917—and similar, albeit less successful, revolutions in many other European countries—brought communism, in particular the political theory of Leninism but also on a smaller level Luxemburgism, on the world stage. Antonio Gramsci instigated the concept of hegemony, arguing that the state and the ruling class use culture and ideology to gain the consent of the classes they rule over.

Contemporaneously with the rise of analytic ethics in Anglo-American thought, several new lines of philosophy directed at the critique of existing societies arose between the 1950s and 1980s. Most of these took elements of Marxist economic analysis but combined them with a more cultural or ideological emphasis. One of the founders of Western Marxism, György Lukács developed the theory of class consciousness and introduced the concept of reification in History and Class Consciousness. Out of the Frankfurt School, thinkers like Herbert Marcuse, Theodor W. Adorno, Max Horkheimer, and Jürgen Habermas combined Marxian and Freudian perspectives. Called the father of the New Left, Marcuse introduced the concept of repressive desublimation, in which social control can operate not only by direct control but also by manipulation of desire. Habermas pioneered such concepts as the public sphere, communicative action, and deliberative democracy. Along somewhat different lines, a number of other continental thinkers—still largely influenced by Marxism—put new emphases on structuralism and on a "return to Hegel". Within the (post-) structuralist line (though mostly not taking that label) are thinkers such as Gilles Deleuze, Michel Foucault, Claude Lefort, and Jean Baudrillard. The Situationists were more influenced by Hegel; Guy Debord, in particular, moved a Marxist analysis of commodity fetishism to the realm of consumption, and looked at the relation between consumerism and dominant ideology formation.

=== Objectivism ===
Ayn Rand was the founder of Objectivism and a prime mover of the libertarian movement in mid-twentieth-century America. Advocating a complete, laissez-faire capitalism, Rand held that the proper role of government was exclusively the protection of individual rights without economic interference. The government was to be separated from economics the same way and for the same reasons it was separated from religion. Any governmental action not directed at the defense of individual rights would constitute the initiation of force (or threat of force), and therefore a violation not only of rights but also of the legitimate function of government.

=== Republicanism ===
A pair of overlapping political perspectives arising toward the end of the 20th century are republicanism (or neo- or civic-republicanism) and the capability approach. The resurgent republican movement aims to provide an alternative definition of liberty from Isaiah Berlin's positive and negative forms of liberty, namely "liberty as non-domination." Unlike the American liberal movement which understands liberty as "non-interference", "non-domination" entails individuals not being subject to the arbitrary will of any other person. To a republican the mere status as a slave, regardless of how that slave is treated, is objectionable. Prominent republicans include historian Quentin Skinner, jurist Cass Sunstein, and political philosopher Philip Pettit. The capability approach, pioneered by economists Mahbub ul Haq and Amartya Sen and further developed by legal scholar Martha Nussbaum, understands freedom under allied lines: the real-world ability to act. Both the capability approach and republicanism treat choice as something which must be resourced. In other words, it is not enough to be legally able to do something, but to have the real option of doing it.

=== Social liberalism ===
In Anglo-American academic political philosophy, the publication of John Rawls's A Theory of Justice in 1971 is considered a milestone. Rawls used a thought experiment, the original position, in which representative parties choose principles of justice for the basic structure of society from behind a veil of ignorance. Rawls also offered a criticism of utilitarian approaches to questions of political justice. Robert Nozick's 1974 book Anarchy, State, and Utopia, which won a National Book Award, criticized the social liberalism of Rawls from a libertarian perspective, gaining much academic respectability.

=== Traditionalism ===
Julius Evola called for a return to pre-Renaissance values of tradition and aristocracy while discussing possible ways to survive the inevitable collapse of the modern civilization and to bring forth a new order.

== See also ==
- Divine right of kings
- History of economic thought
- History of feminism
- History of political science
- Intellectual history
