= Ideal theory (politics) =

Argument concerning political or social arrangements under favorable assumptions

In political philosophy, an ideal theory is a theory which specifies the optimal societal structure based on idealised assumptions and normative theory. It stems from the assumption that citizens are fully compliant to a state which enjoys favorable social conditions, which makes it unrealistic in character. Ideal theories do not offer solutions to real world problems, instead the aim of ideal theory is to provide a guide for improvements based on what society should normatively appear to be. Another interpretation of ideal theories is that they are end-state theories.

Ideal theory is contrasted with non-ideal theory in political philosophy. Scholars such as Amartya Sen provide a critique on ideal theory as an approach for being too idealistic and unnecessary.

The distinction between ideal theory and non-ideal theory was first proposed by John Rawls in A Theory of Justice. Rawls' reasoning behind using ideal theory is that it provides a necessary base for non-ideal theories to follow. His conception of the world in his work is based on an ideal perfect society. In this society, principles of justice are created behind a “veil of ignorance”, which situates citizens outside their social position in order for them to bargain without the influence of their self-interest. The main claim of Rawls’ ideal hypothesis is that there would be no disadvantaged or advantaged group, therefore, a situation of ideal equal fairness would be in place.

== Ideal theory vs. non- ideal theory ==
Ideal theory assumes full compliance, citizens are subject to the rules of a state and fully adhere to them. These rules need not be just but the compliance to them is what contributes to the optimum of a society. Rules in ideal theory often outline what ought to take precedence in order for favorable conditions to appear and be maintained. In contrast with the principle of full compliance of ideal theory, partial compliance is a characteristic of non-ideal theory. Full compliance cannot be realised within non-ideal theories because these take into consideration unfavourable social conditions which lead to negative consequences such as crises. Partial compliance more closely resembles a realistic social configuration of today, thus another feature that differs between ideal and non-ideal theories is the realistic elements in each.

In terms of idealisation and reality, Colin Farelly and Charles Mills suggest that normative debates cannot be addressed by ideal theory because the assumptions on which these rest are false. This also forms part of the criticism given by Amartya Sen, who argues that ideal theory is too idealistic. Instead, non-ideal theory provides proposals based on situations which are observable in social reality.

Ideal theory provides a view of how society ought to be like and indicates the principles that have to be in place in order to achieve it. This idealized vision exists as a long term goal or something to strive for due to the assumptions it lies upon. This qualifies ideal theory as an end-state theory. Non-ideal theory is seen as a transitional theory because the means through which social issues are presented are through improvements which are based on the existing social reality instead of an out-of-reach vision.
