= Mary Lyndon Shanley =

American political scientist and legal scholar

- Born: 1944 (age 81–82); Evanston, Illinois
- Awards: Woodrow Wilson Fellow

Academic background
- Education: Wellesley College; Harvard University
- Thesis: Miguel De Unamuno: His Political Thought and Activity (1972)

Academic work
- Institutions: Vassar College
- Main interests: Feminist legal scholar

Mary Lyndon Shanley (b. 13 May 1944 Evanston, Illinois -- ) is a feminist legal scholar specializing gender studies and issues of the American family and reproductive technologies. At her retirement she was the Margaret Stiles Halleck Professor of Political Science at Vassar College. She also taught writing to women in the Taconic Correctional Facility.

She said of her teaching career, "I thought about ways to help students to see that the issues we study—sexual discrimination; the nature of gender identity; intimate partner violence; intersections of gender, class, race, and sexual orientation—have endured and changed across the decades at Vassar".

== Early life and education ==
Shanley was born in Evanston, Illinois, to Barbara (Smith) Shanley and Lyndon Shanley, a professor and administrator at Northwestern University. Her brother, F. Shephard Shanley, also became a Northwestern University administrator. She graduated from Evanston Township High School in 1962, received her B.A. from Wellesley College in 1966, and her Masters and Doctoral degrees in government from Harvard University in 1968 and 1972. She joined the political science faculty of Vassar College in 1973, where she taught until her retirement.

== Gender studies and career ==
Shanley recalled that when the Vassar Political Science Department interviewed her for the job, they asked if she would teach a course on women and politics. She had no graduate training, had not taken a course in the field, as Harvard had offered none, but "shamelessly" said, "of course", and "unexpectedly, the study of gender became my life's work."

Her first book, Feminism, Marriage and the Law in Victorian England, published by Princeton University Press in 1989, was historically oriented, and drew on her study of nineteenth century figures such as John Stuart Mill. The political scientist Isaac Kramnick called it "an important book, well written in clear and accessible language." He wrote that "with meticulous care" she "traces the assault on marital slavery" that went beyond the familiar attack by Mill. Shanley introduces readers to lesser known feminist women and men and explores how they turned notions of individual freedom and equality and the doctrine of consent against established marital law.

Shanley also wrote on current issues of politics and social change. Her Just Marriage: On the Public Importance of Private Unions, was published in a volume that included ten commentaries on this lengthy lead essay. Her essay weighed the issues in the controversy over the nature of marriage, especially one raised by conservatives around gay marriage. The historian Linda Gordon, reviewing the book in the journal Perspectives on Politics, said that some social commentators argued that the present form of marriage was unjust because many were excluded from access to it or could not find a partner, while others turned to other forms of relationships or argued that the institution was oppressive. But Shanley replied that marriage was essential not just to the individual but to the needs of society, such as caring for childred and dependents. She concluded that the state therefore had just authority to regulate the institution.

She has written on the idea of the "ethic of care" in U.S. political science.

== Representative publications ==
=== Selected articles and chapters ===
- ---, "Miguel De Unamuno: Death & Politics in the Work of a Twentieth-Century Philosopher," Polity 9.3 (1977): 257-278. https://dx.doi.org/10.2307/3234223
- ---, "The History of the Family in Modern England," Signs 4.4 (1979): 740-750.
- ---, "Women in Western Political Thought," Political Theory 8.4 (1980): 547-550. https://dx.doi.org/10.1177/009059178000800406
- ---, Marital Slavery and Friendship: John Stuart Mill's the Subjection of Women," Political Theory 9.2 (1981): 229-247. https://dx.doi.org/10.1177/00905917810090020 5
- ---, ""One Must Ride Behind": Married Women's Rights and the Divorce Act of 1857," Victorian Studies 25.3 (1982): 355-376.
- ---, "A Case against Pregnancy Contracts: Embodied Selves, Liberal Theory and the Law," Politics and the Life sciences : The journal of the Association for Politics and the Life Sciences 8.2 (1990): 216-20.
- ---, "Marital Slavery and Friendship : John Stuart Mill's "the Subjection of Women"," Feminist Interpretations and Political theory. (1991):
- ---, ""Surrogate Mothering" and Women's Freedom : A Critique of Contracts for Human Reproduction," Signs (1993):
- ---, with Michael J. Sandel, "Liberalism and the Future of Democracy," Stanford Law Review 49.5 (1997): 1271. http://dx.doi.org/10.2307/1229253
- ---, "The Cambridge Companion to Mill: The Subjection of Woman," The Cambridge Companion to Mill (1998):
- ---, "Public Policy and the Ethics of Care," Hypatia 16.3 (2001): 157-160.
- ---, "El Derecho Reproductivo Y El Mercado De Esperma Y Óvulos Humanos," Revista Internacional de Filosofía Política (2001):99- 119
- ---, "Collaboration and Commodification in Assisted Procreation: Reflections on an Open Market and Anonymous Donation in Human Sperm and Eggs," Law & Society Review 36.2 (2002): 257-284. https://dx.doi.org/10.2307/1512177
- ---, "Toward New Understandings of Adoption: Individuals and Relationships in Transracial and Open Adoption," Nomos 44 (2003): 15-57.
- Shanley, Molly (Fall 2013), "The Last Page: Forty Years of Feminism at Vassar", Vassar: The Alumnae/I Quarterly, 109 (3)
- ---, "College Courses in County Jails: Pipedreams or Possibilities?," PS, Political Science & Politics 52.1 (2019): 89-92.
- ---, Adrienne Asch, "Involuntary Childlessness, Reproductive Technology, and Social Justice: The Medical Mask on Social Illness," Signs: Journal of Women in Culture and Society 34.4 (2009): 851-874. http://dx.doi.org/10.1086/597141

=== Books ===
- Mary Lyndon Shanley, Miguel De Unamuno: His Political Thought and Activity (1972). Thesis (Ph. D.)--Harvard University, 1972.
- Shanley, Mary Lyndon (1989). Feminism, marriage and the law in Victorian England. Princeton: Princeton University Press. ISBN 9780691078199.
- Shanley, Mary Lyndon; Pateman, Carole (1991). Feminist interpretations and political theory. University Park: Pennsylvania State University Press. ISBN 9780271007427.
- Shanley, Mary Lyndon (2001). Making babies, making families: What matters most in an age of reproductive technologies, surrogacy, adoption, and same-sex and unwed parents. Beacon.
- Shanley, Mary Lyndon; Young, Iris Marion; Neill, Daniel (2008). Illusion of consent engaging with Carole Pateman. University Park, Pennsylvania: Pennsylvania State University Press. ISBN 9780271035918.
- Shanley, Mary Lyndon (2004). Just marriage: On the Public Importance of Private Unions. with commentary by Joshua Cohen, Deborah Chasman. Oxford UK New York: Oxford University Press. ISBN 9780195176261.
