= Remarks After the Hanging of John Brown =

1859 speech by Henry David Thoreau

"Remarks After the Hanging of John Brown" was a speech given by Henry David Thoreau on December 2, 1859, the day of John Brown's execution. Thoreau gave a few brief remarks of his own, read poetry by Sir Walter Raleigh ("The Soul's Errand"), William Collins ("How Sleep the Brave"), Friedrich Schiller (excerpts from Samuel Taylor Coleridge's translation of "The Death of Wallenstein"), William Wordsworth (excerpts from "Alas! What boots the long laborious quest"), Alfred Tennyson (excerpts from "Maud"), George Chapman (excerpts from "Conspirary of Charles, Duke of Byron"), and Henry Wotton ("The Character of a Happy Life"), and then quoted from his own translation of Tacitus.

== See also ==
- "A Plea for Captain John Brown"
- "The Last Days of John Brown"

== Sources ==
- My Thoughts are Murder to the State by Henry David Thoreau (ISBN 978-1434804266)
- The Higher Law: Thoreau on Civil Disobedience and Reform (ISBN 978-0691118765)
