= Gladstone Mills =

Jamaican academic and public servant (1920–2004)

Gladstone Mills OJ OD (12 February 1920 – 26 September 2004) was a Jamaican academic, sportsman, and public servant.

== Early life ==
Born in Clarendon, Jamaica, Gladstone Mills was the son of Gilbert Mills, a policeman, and Josephine Payton-Mills. His younger brother Don Mills went on to enjoy a notable career in public service, including a post as Jamaica's Ambassador to the United Nations. Gladstone was known to his friends as "Charlie". He received his secondary education at Jamaica College, where he was head boy and captain of the cricket and football teams. He then attended the University of London, where he founded the West Indian Students Union.

== Academic career ==
Mills spent many years teaching at the Mona, Jamaica, campus of the University of the West Indies. There, he was a senior lecturer from 1960 to 1965, a full professor from 1965 to 1990, and a professor emeritus for the remainder of his life. During his time with UWI, he served as head of the school's Department of Government from 1963 to 1980, and as dean of its Faculty of Social Sciences from 1967 to 1970. Under Mills, the school introduced its bachelor's degree, master's degree and doctoral programmes in the field of public administration.

== Public service ==
Michael Manley appointed Mills as the first chairman of Jamaica's Electoral Advisory Committee (EAC), a position that he assumed in 1973 and held until 1979. This organisation helped defuse the political violence that was then rampant in Jamaica, by pursuing electoral reforms and taking control of Jamaica's electoral process away from politicians, placing it instead in the hands of a body that included not only political representatives but also independent, impartial members.

In a 1995 speech, Manley, the long-time leader of the People's National Party, was effusive in his praise for Mills's work with the EAC:

It says everything about Gladstone Mills that at a time of genuine crisis in Jamaica, the two political parties accepted him to be chairman of the Electoral Advisory Committee ... History will say that this may have been Mills' greatest single contribution to his nation. The emergence of the Jamaican democracy from the storm of the late '70s to the relative calm of today's politics owes much to his cool guidance and this flashpoint in our political process. Now we debate public indifference to politics; not whether we can survive them.

In a speech at Mills's funeral in 2004, Opposition Leader Edward Seaga of the Jamaica Labour Party voiced a similar opinion:

"[Mills] was always fair and was a symbol of non-partisanship... His role at the Electoral Advisory Committee since 1979 will forever be the apex of his career in public service. His iron integrity, steady demeanour, and excellent management crafted the EAC into one of the most important and highly regarded bodies in public life, giving Jamaica a model for problem-solving which may be applied to other areas.

Prime minister P. J. Patterson said in tribute to Mills that "his contribution to national life was towering and extremely significant to the nation building process."

== Cricket ==
Mills was a left-arm spin bowler in Jamaica in the 1940s, and on two occasions he dismissed a notable batsman for a "duck": George Headley in a Senior Cup match in 1943, and Everton Weekes in a match in London in 1950. After the end of his playing career, he enjoyed a long tenure as a member of the board of the Jamaica Cricket Association.

== Awards and honours ==
In 1975, Mills was honoured with the Order of Distinction in recognition of his "services in the field of Education and Public Administration". In 1989, his work in these areas was further recognised with the Order of Jamaica.

== Publications ==
Mills published his autobiography, Grist for the Mills: Reflections on a Life, in Jamaica in 1994.

== Death ==
Mills died at his home in Acadia Gardens in Saint Andrew Parish, Jamaica, on the morning of 26 September 2004, as a result of coronary problems. He was survived by his two sons, Charles Wade and Raymond.
