= Indian political philosophy =

Political philosophical thought in India

Indian political philosophy is the branch of philosophical thought in India that addresses questions related to polity, statecraft, justice, law and the legitimacy of forms of governance. It also deals with the scope of religion in state-organization and addresses the legitimacy of sociopolitical institutions in a polity. Political thought in India has a history of more than two millennia from the late Iron Age to Modernity and has influenced the socioreligious systems of Asia tremendously in the lieu of Hindu, Buddhist & Jain political philosophy.

Traces of political thought in India can be found in Samhitas (~1500-1000 BCE) and the Brahmanas (~1000-700 BCE), which often discuss the nature of kingship in the Vedic Age, as well as the roles of the priesthood in an aristocratic tribal-polity. The earliest Dharmashastras, such as Baudhayana (~600 BCE) further take up the discussion of statecraft and state-organization in various subchapters. The Mahabharata, one of the two Epics of Ancient India mentions various schools of statecraft (daṇḍanīti or rājaśāstra) and gives a list of political theorists in the Shanti Parva, Anushasana Parva and Rajadharma Parva.

Many of these theorists are cited by Kautilya (~300 BCE), who is considered to be the putative author of the Arthashastra, a 4th-century BCE treatise on political science, statecraft and kingship. The Arthashastra can be considered to be the earliest surviving work on political philosophy from Ancient India. Its author, Chanakya, was the reputed Prime Minister of the Mauryan Emperor Chandragupta and played an instrumental role in establishing what would become Ancient India's largest empire, stretching from Kabul to the Tamil country. Chanakya has been cast in the light of Niccolò Machiavelli as one of the most famous proponents of realpolitik, even though this comparison is anachronistic as Chanakya lived two millennia before Machiavelli. His emphasis on political realism was extremely influential on later Indian political thought, and was different from the divine command moral-realism of the later Puranas. While Chanakya still placed an emphasis on the study of scripture as a component to decide public policy, other schools of political philosophy in India such as those of Brihaspati and Shukra took a more extreme stance and sidelined it in favor of daṇḍanīti.

Indian political thought is continued in the Panchatantra of Vishnusharman (~200 BCE), a collection of stories in Sanskrit prose that were composed for the education of young princes and which instruct people on statecraft, virtues, war, polity and teach nīti (moral philosophy, political wisdom) using anthropomorphized animals as the narrators. The Panchatantra is widely considered to be 'the most widely translated literary product' of India and gained widespread popularity all over Medieval Europe, Sassanid Persia and quickly becoming an Arab classic, going on to influence the Arabian Nights. Similar to the Panchatantra is the 8th century Hitopdesha of Narayana Pandita, another text that aimed to teach nīti or political wisdom via anthropomporhized fables of animal narrators.
