= Charles W. Mills =

Jamaican-American academic philosopher (1951–2021)

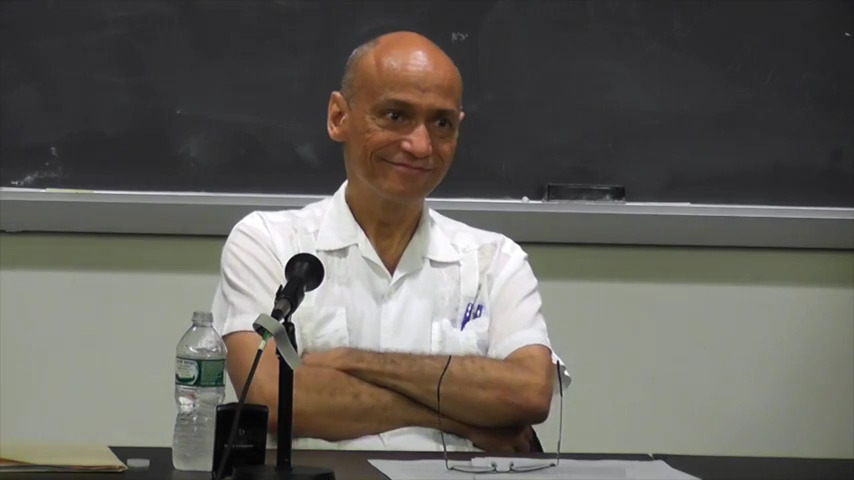
- Charles W. Mills (2015)
- Born: Charles Wade Mills; January 3, 1951; London, England, UK
- Died: September 20, 2021 (aged 70); Evanston, Illinois, US
- Awards: Gustavus Myers Outstanding Book Award

Academic background
- Education: University of the West Indies (BSc); University of Toronto (MA, PhD)
- Thesis: The Concept of Ideology in the Thought of Marx and Engels (1985)

Academic work
- Era: 20th-century philosophy
- Institutions: Northwestern University; City University of New York
- Notable works: The Racial Contract

Charles Wade Mills (January 3, 1951 – September 20, 2021) was a Caribbean-American philosopher who specialized in political philosophy. Mills was a professor at The Graduate Center of the City University of New York (CUNY), and Northwestern University. He made major contributions to critical race theory, most notably with his book The Racial Contract (1997). Born in London, Mills grew up in Jamaica and later became a United States citizen. He was educated at the University of the West Indies where he received his bachelor's degree in physics, and the University of Toronto where he went on to get his master's and doctoral degrees in philosophy.

== Early life and education ==
Charles Wade Mills was born on January 3, 1951, in London, England, to Winnifred and Gladstone Mills. His parents were graduate students in London and moved to Kingston, Jamaica, shortly after he was born. He grew up in Kingston.

Mills received a BSc in physics at the University of the West Indies in 1971 and an MA and PhD in philosophy from the University of Toronto in 1976 and 1985, respectively. His dissertation was titled The Concept of Ideology in the Thought of Marx and Engels. He endorsed historical materialism until the 1990s. While at the University of Toronto, Mills helped to unionize teaching assistants.

== Academic career ==
Mills taught physics in Kingston from 1971 to 1973 at the College of Arts, Science and Technology, and from 1976 to 1977 at Campion College; he later taught philosophy at the University of Oklahoma (1987–90) and the University of Illinois at Chicago (1990–2007) where he was a UIC Distinguished Professor.

Mills was John Evans Professor of Moral and Intellectual Philosophy at Northwestern University, before his appointment as Distinguished Professor at The Graduate Center of the City University of New York (CUNY), in August 2016. He was elected a fellow of the American Academy of Arts and Sciences in 2017. He gave the Tanner Lectures on Human Values in 2020.

== Views ==
Over his career, Mills published six books and over 100 articles. Shannon Sullivan argues that Mills's oeuvre can be understood through the concept of smadditizin, a word Mills used in the title of a 1997 article. Sullivan, quoting Mills, describes smadditizin as "the struggle to have one's personhood recognized" [emphasis in original]. She argues that, no matter whether he embraced Marxism, Black radicalism, or racial liberalism, Mills's work opposed the non-recognition of persons. According to an obituary in CBC News, Mills is regarded as a pioneer in critical race theory and the philosophy of race. Philosopher Christopher Lebron described him in The Nation as a "black Socrates".

Mills's book The Racial Contract (1997) won a Gustavus Myers Outstanding Book Award for the study of bigotry and human rights in North America. The Racial Contract posits that the social contract is really a contract based on the notion of white domination. According to Jamelle Bouie, the work argues that "classic contractarian theories", such as those proposed by "Thomas Hobbes, John Locke, Jean-Jacques Rousseau, and Immanuel Kant", "were built on an assumption of white racial domination, a racial contract, so to speak".

The role gender plays in race relations in Mills's work was addressed by Kathryn T. Gines: "The racial contract and the sexual contract have been perceived as parallel non-intersecting universes and he [Mills] is providing a conceptual intervention." Mills was aware of white female feminism and black female feminism and how both were perceived differently. Gines argues against Mills's point regarding non-white males non-participation in patriarchy: "I problematize Mills’s claim that 'race generally trumps gender' and argue for a more nuanced analysis of nonwhite men’s participation in patriarchy and privilege."

Later in his career, according to Tommie Shelby, Mills launched a sustained critique of John Rawls's contractarian theory of justice. Shelby notes that Mills rejected the Rawlsian turn to ideal theory in political philosophy in favor of an approach that takes careful account of the realities of oppression. Despite his critique of Rawls, however, Mills came to endorse a version of liberalism in Black Rights/White Wrongs: The Critique of Racial Liberalism, suggesting that the history of liberalism reveals the dismantling of social hierarchies. Reviewing Black Rights/White Wrongs in Political Theory, Ainsley LeSure observes that "[t]hough [Mills] acknowledges that racial justice need not be realized through the liberal tradition, he affirms that it can."

== Personal life ==
Mills has been described as "Afro-Caribbean", "Caribbean", and "Jamaican". He described himself as "Caribbean-American".

In a 2014 publication, Mills stated, "I was a citizen of a small Third World country, Jamaica, which owed its very existence to … oppressive international forces." As of October 2020, Mills was an American citizen.

Mills was diagnosed with metastatic cancer in May 2021. He died of cancer in Evanston, Illinois, on September 20, 2021.

== Principal publications ==
=== Books ===
- Mills, Charles W. (January 27, 2014) [1997]. The Racial Contract. Cornell University Press. doi:10.7591/9780801471353. ISBN 978-0-8014-7135-3. JSTOR 10.7591/j.ctt5hh1wj. S2CID 153842070.
- Mills, Charles W. (December 18, 2015) [1998]. Blackness Visible: Essays on Philosophy and Race. Cornell University Press. doi:10.7591/9781501702952. ISBN 978-1-5017-0295-2. JSTOR 10.7591/j.ctt1tm7j79.
- From Class to Race: Essays in White Marxism and Black Radicalism. Rowman & Littlefield. 2003. ISBN 0-7425-1301-7. OCLC 52216116.
- Mills, Charles W.; Sample, Ruth J.; Sterba, James P., eds. (2004). Philosophy: The Big Questions. Blackwell. ISBN 1-4051-0828-2. OCLC 52386246.
- Mills, Charles W.; Pateman, Carole (2013). The Contract and Domination. Polity. ISBN 978-0-7456-3621-4. OCLC 843202341.
- Radical Theory, Caribbean Reality: Race, Class and Social Domination. University of the West Indies Press. 2010. ISBN 978-1-4619-0675-9. OCLC 759207752.
- Mills, Charles W. (May 25, 2017). Black Rights/White Wrongs: The Critique of Racial Liberalism. Oxford University Press. doi:10.1093/acprof:oso/9780190245412.001.0001. ISBN 978-0-19-024541-2.

=== Journals ===
- Mills, Charles W. (1988). "Alternative Epistemologies". Social Theory and Practice. 14 (3): 237–263. ISSN 0037-802X.
- Mills, Charles W. (1994). "Do Black Men Have a Moral Duty to Marry Black Women?". Journal of Social Philosophy. 25 (s1): 131–153. doi:10.1111/j.1467-9833.1994.tb00352.x. ISSN 1467–9833.
- Mills, Charles W. (1994). "Marxism, 'Ideology' and Moral Objectivism". Canadian Journal of Philosophy. 24 (3): 373–393. ISSN 0045–5091.
- Mills, Charles W. (2003). ""Heart" Attack: A Critique of Jorge Garcia's Volitional Conception of Racism". The Journal of Ethics. 7 (1): 29–62. ISSN1382-4554
- Mills, Charles W. (2005). ""Ideal Theory" as Ideology". Hypatia. 20 (3): 165–184. ISSN 0887–5367.
- Mills, Charles W. (2009). "Rousseau, the Master's Tools, and Anti-Contractarian Contractarianism". The CLR James Journal. 15 (1): 92–112. ISSN 2167–4256.
- Mills, Charles W. (2009). "Rawls on Race/Race in Rawls". The Southern Journal of Philosophy. 47 (S1): 161–184. doi:10.1111/j.2041-6962.2009.tb00147.x. ISSN 2041–6962.
- Mills, Charles W. (2010). "Blacks and Social Justice: A Quarter-Century Later". Journal of Social Philosophy. 41 (3): 354–369. doi:10.1111/j.1467-9833.2010.01493.x. ISSN1467-9833.
- Mills, Charles W. (2013). "An Illuminating Blackness". The Black Scholar. 43 (4): 32–37. doi:10.5816/blackscholar.43.4.0032. ISSN 0006–4246.
