= Carole Pateman =

British political theorist (born 1940)

Carole Pateman FBA FAcSS FLSW
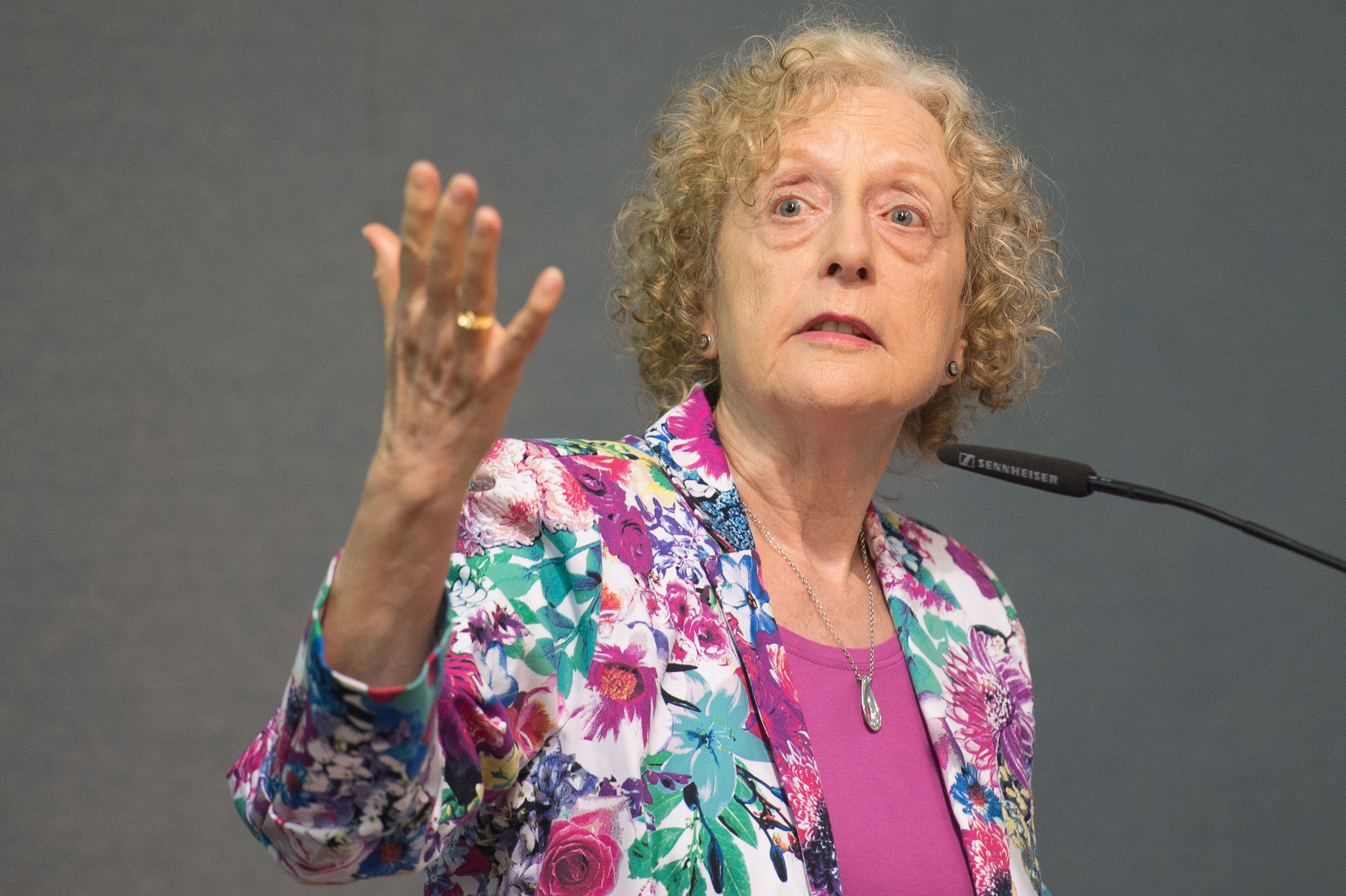
- Pateman in 2015
- Born: 11 December 1940 (age 85); Maresfield, Sussex, England
- Education: Ruskin College, Oxford (BA); Lady Margaret Hall, Oxford (MA, DPhil)
- Known for: Criticism of liberal democracy
- Notable work: The Sexual Contract
- Awards: Johan Skytte Prize in Political Science
- Scientific career
- Workplaces: University of California at Los Angeles (UCLA)

Carole Pateman FBA FAcSS FLSW (born 11 December 1940) is a British feminist and political theorist. She is known as a critic of liberal democracy and has been a member of the British Academy since 2007.

== Biography ==
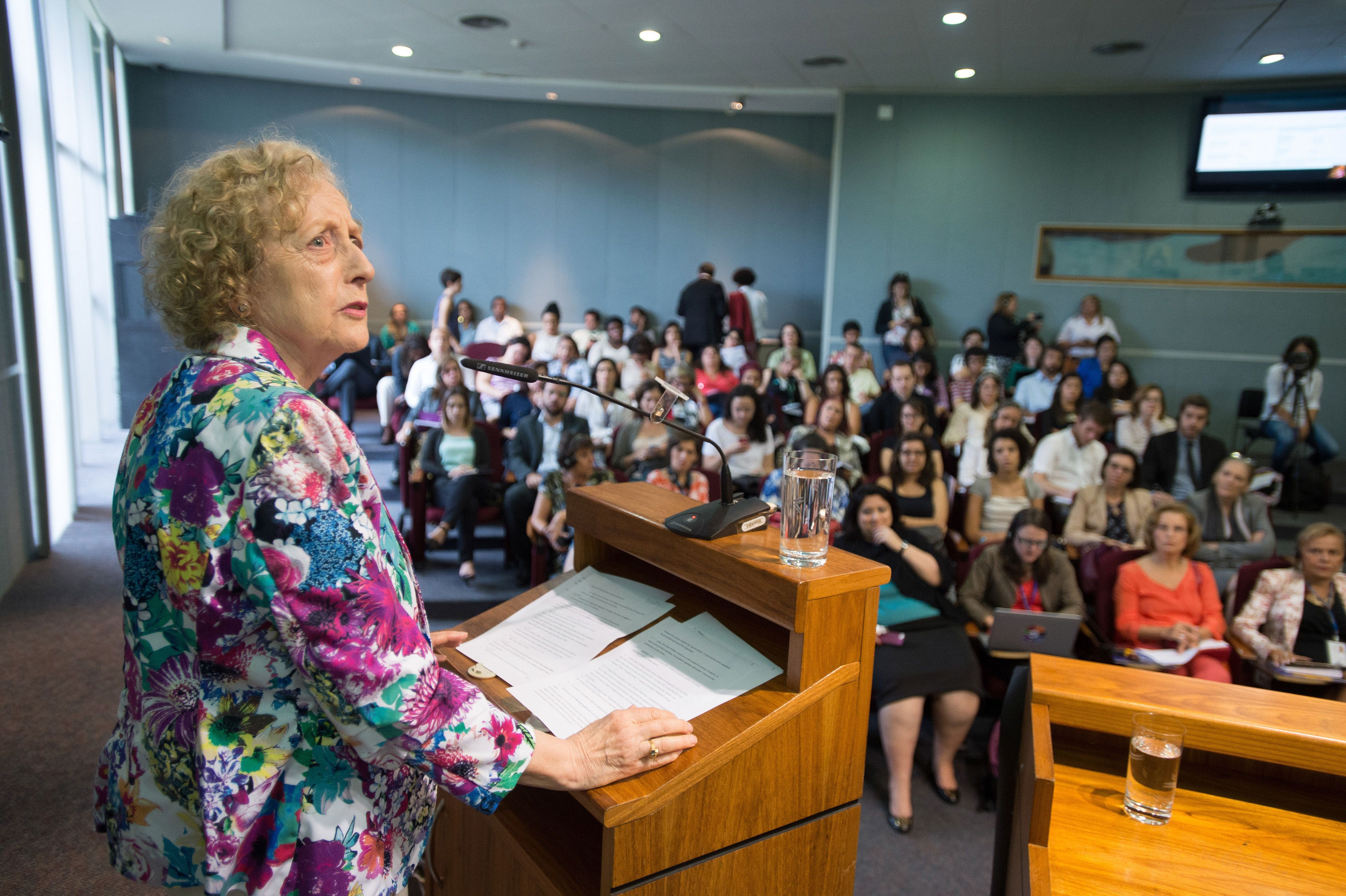
Lecture by Pateman during the UN Beijing+20: More Women in Politics seminar in 2015

Pateman was born in Maresfield, Sussex, England. Educated at Lewes County Grammar School for Girls, she left at age 16. She entered Ruskin College, Oxford, in 1963 studying economics, politics, history and sociology, achieving a distinction. She won a place at Lady Margaret Hall to read PPE, staying on to earn a DPhil degree.

In 1972, she became lecturer in political theory at the University of Sydney. Since 1990, Pateman has taught in the Department of Political Science at the University of California at Los Angeles (UCLA), where she is now a Distinguished Professor Emeritus. Pateman served as (the first woman) President of the International Political Science Association (1991–1994). In 2007, she was named a Fellow of the British Academy. She served as president of the American Political Science Association from 2010 to 2011. She is also an Honorary Professor at the Cardiff University School of European Studies.

Pateman gave the Faculty Research Lecture at UCLA in 2001, and is a Fellow of the American Academy of Arts and Sciences, the British Academy and the UK Academy of Social Sciences. She holds honorary degrees from the Australian National University, the National University of Ireland, and Helsinki University.

== Awards ==
Pateman was a Guggenheim Fellow in 1993–1994.

Pateman has been a Member of the International Advisory Board of the Swedish Collegium for Advanced Study. In 1989, she was a Fellow at the same institution.

In 2012, she was awarded the Johan Skytte Prize in Political Science.

In 2013, she earned the Special Recognition Award by the UK Political Studies Association.

In April 2015, she was elected as a Fellow of the Learned Society of Wales.

The Australian Political Science Association (APSA) awards the Carole Pateman Prize biennially for the best book published on the topic of gender and politics.

== Bibliography ==
=== Books ===
- Pateman, Carole (1970). Participation and democratic theory. Cambridge England: Cambridge University Press. ISBN 978-0-521-29004-3.
- Pateman, Carole (1979). The problem of political obligation: a critical analysis of liberal theory. Chichester New York: Wiley. ISBN 978-0-471-99699-6.
- Pateman, Carole (1985). The problem of political obligation: a critique of liberal theory. Cambridge: Polity in association with Blackwell. ISBN 978-0-7456-0135-9.
- Pateman, Carole (1988). The Sexual Contract. Cambridge: Polity in association with Blackwell. ISBN 0804714770
- Pateman, Carole (1989). The disorder of women: democracy, feminism, and political theory. Stanford, California: Stanford University Press. ISBN 978-0-8047-1765-6.
- Pateman, Carole; Dowding, Keith; Goodin, Robert E. (2004). Justice and democracy: essays for Brian Barry. Cambridge New York: Cambridge University Press. ISBN 978-0-521-83695-1.
- Pateman, Carole; Mills, Charles W. (2007). Contract and domination. Cambridge: Polity Press. ISBN 978-0-7456-4004-4.

=== Edited books ===
- Pateman, Carole; Sawer, Marian (1980). Australasian Political Studies Association directory of women political scientists 1980. Canberra: Australasian Political Studies Association. OCLC 220934996.
- Pateman, Carole; Goodnow, Jacqueline (1985). Women, social science and public policy. Sydney London: Allen & Unwin. ISBN 978-0-86861-685-8.
- Pateman, Carole; Shanley, Mary Lyndon (1991). Feminist interpretations and political theory. University Park: Pennsylvania State University Press. ISBN 978-0-271-00742-7.
- Pateman, Carole; Murray, Matthew C. (2012). Basic income worldwide horizons of reform. Houndmills, Basingstoke New York, New York: Palgrave Macmillan. ISBN 978-0-230-28542-2.
- Pateman, Carole (2014). Feminist challenges: social and political theory (2nd ed.). London: Routledge. ISBN 978-1-138-00068-1. Original printed in 1986.

=== Chapters in books ===
- Pateman, Carole (2003), "Freedom and democratization: why basic income is preferred to basic capital", in Dowding, Keith; de Wispelaere, Jurgen; White, Stuart (eds.), The ethics of stakeholding, New York: Palgrave Macmillan, pp. 130–148, ISBN 978-1-4039-0580-2.

=== Journal articles ===
- Pateman, Carole, ed. (1983). "Introduction". Australian Journal of Political Science. 18 (2): 1–2. doi:10.1080/00323268308401882.
- Pateman, Carole (March 2012). "Participatory Democracy Revisited". Perspectives on Politics. 10 (1): 7–19. doi:10.1017/S1537592711004877. S2CID 145534893.

=== Videos ===
- The Equivalent of the Right to Land, Life, and Liberty? Democracy and the Idea of a Basic Income (Link)

== See also ==
- Feminism in the United Kingdom
- Universal basic income in the United Kingdom
