= The Last Days of John Brown =

1860 essay by Henry David Thoreau

"The Last Days of John Brown" is an essay by Henry David Thoreau, written in 1860, that praised the executed abolitionist militia leader John Brown. He read it at the July 4, 1860, memorial service held at Brown's home in North Elba. It was first published in The Liberator of July 27, 1860.

== See also ==
- "A Plea for Captain John Brown"
- "Remarks After the Hanging of John Brown"

== Sources ==
- A Yankee in Canada with Anti-Slavery and Reform Papers (ISBN 978-0837120447)
- My Thoughts are Murder to the State by Henry David Thoreau (ISBN 978-1434804266)
- The Higher Law: Thoreau on Civil Disobedience and Reform (ISBN 978-0691118765)
- Collected Essays and Poems by Henry David Thoreau (ISBN 978-1-88301195-6)
