= A Plea for Captain John Brown =

Essay by Henry David Thoreau

"A Plea for Captain John Brown" is an essay by Henry David Thoreau, based on a speech he first delivered to an audience at Concord, Massachusetts, on October 30, 1859, two weeks after John Brown's raid on Harpers Ferry, and repeated several times before Brown's execution on December 2, 1859. It was later published as a part of Echoes of Harper's Ferry in 1860.

== Context ==
John Brown, a radical abolitionist, and 21 other men seized the Federal armory at Harper's Ferry, the holding place for approximately 100,000 rifles and muskets, hoping to arm slaves and create a violent rebellion against the South. After 36 hours, the revolt was suppressed by Federal forces led by Robert E. Lee, and Brown was jailed. The raid resulted in thirteen deaths: twelve rebels and one U.S. Marine.

Ralph Waldo Emerson, in a memorial essay written after Thoreau's death, describes the first presentation of this essay:

Before the first friendly word had been spoken for Captain John Brown, he [Thoreau] sent notices to most houses in Concord, that he would speak in a public hall on the condition and character of John Brown, on Sunday evening, and invited all people to come. The Republican Committee, the Abolitionist Committee, sent him word that it was premature and not advisable. He replied,—“I did not send to you for advice, but to announce that I am to speak.” The hall was filled at an early hour by people of all parties, and his earnest eulogy of the hero was heard by all respectfully, by many with a sympathy that surprised themselves.

Brown himself, after being found guilty of murder, treason, and inciting a slave insurrection, was hanged on December 2, 1859. Although largely called a failure at the time, the raid and Brown's subsequent execution impelled the American Civil War.

== Synopsis ==
Thoreau's essay espoused John Brown and his fight for abolition. In opposition with popular opinion of the time – Thoreau vehemently refuted the claims of newspapers and his fellow countrymen who characterized Brown as foolish and insane – he painted a portrait of a peerless man whose embrace of a cause was unparalleled. Brown's commitment to justice and adherence to the United States Constitution forced him to fight state-sponsored injustice, one he was only affected by in spirit.

A unique man, Thoreau proclaimed in admiration, Brown was highly moral and humane. Independent, "under the auspices of John Brown and nobody else", and direct of speech, Brown instilled fear, which he attributed to a lack of cause, into large groups of men who supported slavery. Incomparable to man, Thoreau likens Brown's execution – he states that he regards Brown as dead before his actual death – to Christ's crucifixion at the hands of Pontius Pilate, with whom he compares the American government.

Thoreau vents at the scores of Americans who have voiced their displeasure and scorn for John Brown. The same people, Thoreau says, can't relate to Brown because of their concrete stances and "dead" existences; they are truly not living, only a handful of men have lived. Thoreau also criticizes contemporary Christians, who say their prayers and then go to sleep aware of injustice but doing nothing to change it. Similarly, Thoreau states those who believe Brown threw his life away and died as a fool, are themselves fools. Brown gave his life for justice, not for material gains, and was completely sane, perhaps more so than any other human being. Rebutting the arguments based on the small number of rebels, Thoreau responds "when were the good and the brave ever in a majority?" Thoreau also points out the irony of The Liberator, an abolitionist newspaper, labeling Brown's actions as misguided.

== See also ==
- "Remarks After the Hanging of John Brown"
- "The Last Days of John Brown"
