= The Racial Contract =

1997 book by Charles Mills

- First edition
- Author: Charles W. Mills
- Language: English
- Subject: Political philosophy
- Publisher: Cornell University Press
- Publication date: 1997
- Publication place: United States
- Media type: Hardcover
- Pages: 171
- ISBN: 978-0-8014-8463-6

The Racial Contract is a book by the Jamaican philosopher Charles W. Mills in which he argues that, although it is conventional to represent the social contract moral and political theories of Thomas Hobbes, John Locke, Jean-Jacques Rousseau, and Immanuel Kant as neutral with respect to race and ethnicity, these social contracts only regulated relations between whites. The book demonstrates the ways in which social contract theorists helped to create a "racial contract," which formally and informally permits whites to oppress and exploit people of color and validate their own moral ideals in dealing with non-whites. Because in contemporary political philosophy, white philosophers take their own white privilege for granted, they don't recognize that white supremacy is a political system, and so in their developments of ideal, moral and political theory never consider actual practice. Mills proposes to develop a non-ideal theory "to explain and expose the inequities of the actual nonideal policy and to help us see through the theories and moral justifications offered in defense of them." Using it as a central concept, "the notion of a Racial Contract might be more revealing of the real character of the world we are living in, and the corresponding historical deficiencies of its normative theories and practices, than the raceless notions currently dominant in political theory."

The Racial Contract has sold over 50,000 copies and been adopted in hundreds of courses in the United States in philosophy as well as "political science, sociology, anthropology, literature, education, African American, American Studies, and other subjects." The book has been translated into Korean, Turkish, and French.

In 2022, Cornell University Press issued a 25th-anniversary edition with a new introduction by Mills and a foreword by Tommie Shelby, Caldwell Titcomb Professor of African and African American Studies and of Philosophy at Harvard University.

The book won a Gustavus Myers Outstanding Book Award for the study of bigotry and human rights in America.

The American Political Science Association chose Mills as the recipient of its biennial Benjamin E. Lippincott Award, which "honors exceptional work by a living political theorist that is still considered significant after a time span of at least 15 years since the original publication."

== Synopsis ==
Mills argues that racism is at the core of the "social contract", rather than racism being an unintended result attributed to the failings of imperfect men. Specifically, the racial contract is a tacit (and at times explicit) agreement among members of the tribes of Europe to assert, promote, and maintain the ideal of white supremacy as against all other tribes of the world. This intention is deliberate and an integral characteristic of the social contract, a characteristic which persists to the present day. In Mills's words, "...what has usually been taken...as the racist 'exception' has really been the rule; what has been taken as the 'rule'...[racial equality]...has really been the exception."

Mills argues that these ideals of the social contract are at worst pure fiction or at best were intended only to apply to a specific group of people, namely members of the tribes of Europe and their genetic descendants. "...when white people say 'Justice,' they mean 'Just Us'."

Rather than viewing white supremacy as an ideology or a set of beliefs that renders the rest of the nonwhite world inferior, the book presents white supremacy as a political system of domination. Mills writes that “racism (or, as I will argue, global white supremacy), is itself a political system, a particular power structure of formal or informal rule, socioeconomic privilege and norms for the differential distribution of material wealth and opportunities, benefits and burdens, rights and duties.” Mills extends white domination to the cultural, cognitive-moral, and metaphysical spheres. The racial contract is a social contract that begins with the idea “we the white people…” and the global society that ensues is marked by domination in all aspects of life. The racial contract also breaks from typical social contract theory, which is a normative tool for determining the ideals of justice (see John Rawls for more contemporary social contract theory), in that it actually attempts to explain how actual society came to be.

== Reception ==
The scholarly reception (in the fields of philosophy and political philosophy) to Mills The Racial Contract has been largely positive with some criticism.

Praise of the work emphasizes how traditional western philosophy, especially in contract theory, has lacked serious conversations about race. For example, Stephen Steinburg points out this missing acknowledgment of race, "in this slim, well crafted volume, Mills cuts through the shibboleths and the mystifications that pervade both popular and academic discourse on race." Edward Johnson analyzes the way in which white western philosophers denied Black or non-white people from the social contract, stating: "Thus in Mills' account of the theories he examines, 'non-white' is taken to signify a non-person rather than a specific racial grouping." This gave white philosophers the ability to exclude non-white people from the protections the social contract granted since they were a "non-person." Thomas McCarthy adds that Mills's book is "conceived as an exercise in "critical race theory"...It excavates the racial presumptions underlying mainstream liberal thought to reveal its dark side." Edward Johnson discusses the color line and difference between "white" and "nonwhite" that Mills emphasizes throughout the book. Johnson agrees with how Mills characterizes racism as "patterns of moral failure" becoming predictable even though these failures may evolve in the way they present themselves to society. Johnson writes: "The arguments are worth starting, or restarting, as we struggle toward that unified theory of oppression which would allow us to sort out competing claims." These reviews done by other philosophers and theorists recognize and appreciate the addition of race into a discussion that had not included it before. Expanding social contract theory to involve race, and in other cases with the Sexual Contract, sex and gender, opens up this discourse for other groups of people.

Critics included Andrew Valls who wished that Mills had "sacrificed some of the book's punchiness for greater philosophical depth." Vall pointed out some contradictions he found in Mills's writing. For example, he found Mills's claims about Hobbes, Locke, and Rousseau to be either unclear or unsubstantiated. In his review of the Racial Contract, Bat-Ami BarOn criticizes the specific notion of consent: "Mills believes...that whites continue to be real signatories to the Racial Contract. Yet, how does one consent to this racial agreement." BarOn adds that "Mills seems to be interested in consent because he is interested in the assignment of moral responsibility and blame". Despite BarOn's issues with some of Mills's assertions throughout the book, he believes that "Mills' idea of a Racial Contract is a courageously creative kind of "dessert speech". For BarOn, Mills's ideas need to be tested and discussed more to follow them to their logical conclusions, work out inconsistencies, and discover their limitations. Some find Mills's work inconsistent, and even contradictory, believing it is not a good response to social contract theory.

A philosopher at Vanderbilt University, named Lucius T. Outlaw Jr., characterized The Racial Contract as a great work of "signifyin" (Black vernacular critique) which exposed the "certified ignorance" of white political theory. Outlaw contends that the "contract" alone is not able to explain the global history of white supremacy, since it fails to account for the very complex "racial worldviews" and social constructs that exist before any such contract could be drafted. (21)

== See also ==
- The Sexual Contract
