= The Sexual Contract =

1988 book by Carole Pateman

- 30th Anniversary Edition
- Author: Carole Pateman
- Language: English
- Subjects: Gender studies, political theory, legal theory
- Publisher: Polity Press
- Publication date: 1 August 1988
- Publication place: United Kingdom
- Media type: Print
- Pages: 280
- Awards: Winner of the 2005 Benjamin E. Lippincott Award, Winner of the 1989 APSA Victoria Schuck Award
- ISBN: 0804714770

The Sexual Contract is a 1988 non-fiction book by British feminist and political theorist Carole Pateman which was published through Polity Press. This book is a seminal work which discusses how contract theory continues to affirm the patriarchy through methods of contractual submission where there is ultimately a power imbalance from systemic sexism. The focus of The Sexual Contract is on rebutting the idea that a post-patriarchal or anti-patriarchal society presently exists as a result of the conception of a civil society. Instead, Pateman argues that civil society continues to aid feminine oppression and that the orthodoxy of contracts such as marriage cannot become equitable to both women and men. Pateman uses a feminist lens when rationalising the argument proposed in The Sexual Contract through the use of works by classic political and liberal philosophers Thomas Hobbes, John Locke, Jean-Jacques Rousseau and later interpreted by the Founding Fathers whom Pateman has before critiqued as being responsible for the development of modern rights and freedoms derived from archaic standards of contract that are deeply embedded within Western Spheres, particularly America, England and Australia, which are the focus areas for her work.

== Background ==
Carole Pateman when writing The Sexual Contract used her previous background in political theory as support to substantiate a feminist commentary and critique on the nature of contracts as tools to control womanhood establishing how "the original contract constitutes men's freedom and women's subjection". Pateman writes within the confines of the Western Tradition which presents both how this tradition excludes women and how it fundamentally supported female oppression in western political and legal thought. Pateman elucidates how The Sexual Contract as a theory is rooted in how the period of enlightenment was essentially led by men for the liberation of men with the quote Liberté, égalité, fraternité excluding the liberation of women through language used within this period, effectively fashioning the beginnings of modern patriarchy. Pateman voices this in order to demonstrate her point that social contracts based upon these ideas of liberty are inherently skewed to favor the sex-right of men and the subordination of women to sustain social contract therefore becoming a sexual contract which inhibits the autonomy of women.

== Summary ==
The Sexual Contract is divided into eight chapters. Pateman utilizes 'feminist storytelling' structures to illustrate contract theory from its origins to its contemporary implications. Pateman displays how contracts affect womanhood in a multitude of ways such as economic and sexual capitalisation, that is exploited from women through marriage, prostitution and surrogacy. The Sexual Contract reveals the complications associated with contract theory and how "Feminists therefore cannot 'reform' those parts of political theory, they must start anew and from scratch".

The articulation throughout the book is that contractarian theory cannot be amended in a progressive manner. Contracts always initiate a political right entailing an intrinsically dominant and subordinate party. Moreover, The Sexual Contract explores how the basis of Western society is built upon the contractual oppression of women in order to uphold a patriarchal regime, depicting how in the wake of social contract between enlightened men there exists "another contract, the sexual contract, by which men gain possession of women."

=== Marriage ===
Pateman pays close attention to the contract obligations associated with marriage: "Women are incorporated into society via the marriage contract but they may enter such a contract not as equal individuals but as natural subordinate". Marriage acts as a way to gain "sexual access" to a woman's body and the "labour" she provides as a wife." It is regarded as a major institution in society: "the institution of marriage gives each husband the capacity, if he so wishes, to ill-treat his wife." The institution of marriage is established as "legal prostitution", an entity comparable to a labour contract, wherein the master (husband) enters into this contract with the servant (housewife) as a subordinate. According to Thomas Hobbes' state of nature, the "conquering" of a woman within the marriage contract leads to the wife's submission as a sexual servant, rendering her the property of the husband who is recognised as the proper member of civil and contractual society. Pateman's issue with marriage begins with how institutionally becoming a 'husband' gives patriarchal right over the 'wife'.

=== Prostitution ===
The example of prostitution is utilised by Pateman to explain how the patriarchy manages to create sexual capital off the sexual labour of women. Using the 'story' of the sexual contract, it becomes apparent that "prostitution is part of the exercise of the law of male sex-right" ensuring continued access to women's bodies. 'The prostitution contract' is outlined by Pateman to be an example of an 'original' sexual contract, becoming a precursor to the metaphorical prostituting of the worker for capital, within civil patriarchal society. Pateman deduces that contractarians defend prostitution as a form of labour explaining that prostitution contracts are similar to employment contracts. This, Pateman shows, is a rationale for enduring affirmation of male sex-right and the monetization of women's bodies, legitimising how prostitution affirms patriarchal status.

=== Surrogacy ===
Surrogacy as an example is used throughout The Sexual Contract to create a dialogue on how women's bodies have become legitimized capital in contemporary society. Pateman outlines how this is a result of the sexual contract imposed onto women similar to the contracts associated with prostitution. The surrogacy contract is another facet of the sexual contract providing a new form of access to women's bodies. The issue within the surrogacy contract is that its aspects are inherently class-based, that is, working-class women are attracted to the financial aspect of this contract, but are ultimately not equal to the party that benefits from the time and nature of the service they are providing. Pateman uses the words of John Locke as an example on the differences between a surrogacy contract and prostitution contract, where although men don't use direct sexual use of a woman's body for surrogacy, the 'mixing of the man's seed' with the 'woman's uterus' if performed 'faithfully' results in a child essentially owned by the male party. Patemans argues the intervention of women within civil society demonstrates how the surrogacy contract remains a part of a dependence on female sexuality and how it is not the discretion of the woman which is valued in the contract but instead her body which is used by society.

=== Conclusion ===
The Sexual Contract concludes with Pateman stating how the original contract is a political fiction that belongs to modern patriarchy. There is no true origin to the original contract; instead, it exists as a progression to liberty but only the liberty of certain individuals. The crux of the issue as outlined by Pateman is that political and legal liberty need to be discussed and explored from a perspective different from a traditionalist one. Pateman seeks in her work to elaborate more thoroughly on the issues with civil society and how it cannot be established as equal because of its patriarchal origins. It instead must be dismissed and re-established to become equitable between the sexes. Women can never truly become individuals because their bodies cannot be forgotten by their male counterparts. A contract between men and women is influenced because of the ideal of embodied feminine beings which can never truly exist, as individuals like men can, with civil society.

== Reception ==
The Sexual Contract received the 2005 Benjamin E. Lippincott Award, sponsored by the American Political Science Association, 17 years after it was initially published. The book has been widely used as an example of work that transcends mainstream academic work being called a "challenging and thought-provoking" work, it has been cited in a number of journals on political theory and feminism and translated into Polish, French, Turkish, Portuguese, Spanish, Croatian and Slovak. The Sexual Contract has remained a relevant and valid addition to feminist theory and is still a work often referenced across many fields of discipline. Thirty years after its initial publication, an anniversary edition of The Sexual Contract was published to celebrate the impact it had on political and feminist theory with the addition of a new preface from the author.

=== Response ===
Pateman states how The Sexual Contract was written specifically with Anglo countries in mind, directly addressing the common-law traditions present within these spheres; however, it has become evident that Pateman's work speaks to a number of experiences from different cultures. An issue in criticisms directed at The Sexual Contract is a contextual problem from when Pateman was writing – the issue of essentialism, taking her nuanced arguments from specific portions of the work without concern for the uniting thread on how The Sexual Contract is most importantly a portrait on how "sexual difference as political difference" between the sexes, is based within the knowledge and works of classic theorists.

=== Impacts on understandings of law and gender ===
The Sexual Contract has become an important work within the context of understanding the intersection between womanhood and political and legal theories with Pateman's work, becoming an entity which "challenges assumptions made in political theory and it has become a classic second-wave feminist text". Pateman's work manages to continue to establish how modern society continues to support the institutional contract which ultimately continues to oppress women. Even with the social change that has occurred over the past thirty years, the increase in migration and the radical changes in working-class industries such as mining and printing, The Sexual Contract with its subsequent theories endures the passage of time with relative ease. The Sexual Contract "has been informed by her [Pateman's] understanding of feminism as a call to keep focused on the big picture, speaking truth to power." Its impact on understandings of law and gender has reached beyond its initial 1988 release. It continues to be consistent with issues within modern movements such as the #MeToo movement which highlights the struggle of supported celebrity women, but skips over women unable to voice their experiences of harassment in case of retaliation from social and economic spheres. This is where Pateman's text supports the idea on how "the un-silencing of women in contemporary society is only partial."

=== Critiques ===
The criticisms of Pateman's argument have focused on her emphasis on the argument of the sexual contract, and the relationship this has with Hobbes' and Locke's views on contract theory, "making Hobbes more theoretically consistent and Locke less overtly patriarchal". Pateman also continually ignores the consensual entering of women into these contracts, or how "female sexual desire" fits into the dominating patriarchal society that Pateman outlines in her work. The Sexual Contract also lacks the nuances of how race and class intersect with social/sexual contract theory, particularly the lack of analysis on how this dynamic works between black individuals or how Pateman's exclusionary approach to sex, race and class threatens to defy the hegemonic narrative Pateman constructs.

== See also ==
- The Racial Contract
