= Encyclopédistes =

Contributors to the development of the Encyclopédie from June 1751 to December 1765

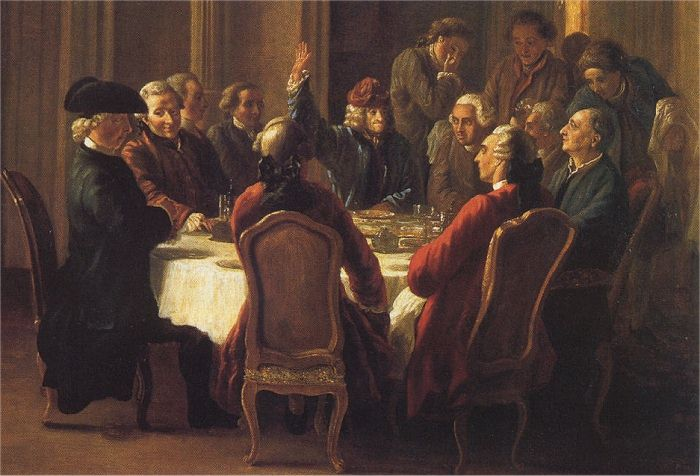
The Philosophers' Meal by Jean Huber, 1772, depicts several of the Encyclopédistes, including Condorcet, d'Alembert, Diderot, and Voltaire.

The Encyclopédistes (French: [ɑ̃siklɔpedist]) (also known in British English as Encyclopaedists, or in US English as Encyclopedists) were contributors to the Encyclopédie, the first encyclopedia with signed contributions from numerous collaborators. The Encyclopédie (1751–1772) was edited by Jean Paul de Gua de Malves from 1746 to 1747, co-edited by Denis Diderot and Jean le Rond d'Alembert from 1747 to 1758, and edited by Diderot alone through 1772.

== History ==
The composition of the 17 volumes of text and 11 volumes of plates of the Encyclopédie was the work of at least 139 authors and 66 artists.

The known contributors to the text of the Encyclopédie were not a unified group, neither in ideology nor social class. Nevertheless, many of the authors belonged to the vaguely defined intellectual group known as the philosophes. As such, they promoted the advancement of science and secular thought and supported the tolerance, rationality, and open-mindedness of the Enlightenment. They were also skilled propagandists who used the Encyclopédie to subtly influence public opinion and spread Enlightenment ideas in France both before and after the French Revolution.

Below, some of the contributors are listed in alphabetical order, by the number of articles that they wrote and by the identifying "signature" by which their contributions were identified in the Encyclopédie. Some of them are well-known, but others, such as Allard, remain a mystery to us. Around half of the articles in the Encyclopédie lack a signature, in some cases because a collaborator wished for anonymity.

Writing a critique of the Encyclopédie in 1768, Diderot recognized that the contributors were a diverse lot: "Along with some excellent men, there were some weak, average, and absolutely bad ones. Whence the spotty quality of the work, where we find the draft of a schoolboy next to a masterpiece."

An incomplete machine-generated list of authors sorted by the number of signed articles can be found on website of ARTFL's digitized edition of the Encyclopédie. There are lists by frequency and by letter.

== Editors and key contributors ==
=== Denis Diderot ===
In the early 1740s, Diderot was working on a French translation of Robert James's A Medicinal Dictionary for the booksellers Antoine-Claude Briasson, Laurent Durand, and Michel-Antoine David. When the latter three became involved with a project for translating Ephraim Chambers' Cyclopaedia (1728) into English, it was only natural that they would turn to Diderot for help. After having worked on the project in other capacities for some time already, Diderot was named co-editor of the Encyclopédie, as the greatly expanded translation was now called, on 16 October 1747. As editor, Diderot wrote the prospectus and, with D'Alembert, reviewed others' articles. As a contributor, he wrote thousands of articles, many on the mechanical arts, philosophy, and natural history.

=== D'Alembert ===
Jean le Rond d'Alembert was already one of Europe's foremost mathematicians when he became the a co-editor of the Encyclopédie in 1747. He wrote the Preliminary Discourse, which borrowed material from Diderot's prospectus. In addition, he contributed articles on mathematics, physics, and other topics. Several of his articles were among the most controversial. In his article on Geneva, published in 1757, he praised his own idealized version of Geneva in such a way as to condemn France implicitly, and he claimed that some Genevan pastors no longer believed in the divinity of Jesus Christ. For some time already, he had found himself frustrated by attacks against the Encyclopédie, and for this and other, undisclosed reasons, he announced his decision to resign as co-editor in early 1758. He continued to write on mathematical subjects for subsequent volumes.

=== Le chevalier de Jaucourt ===
Louis de Jaucourt was born in Paris into a noble family that practiced Protestantism in secret. He trained as a physician but chose to devote himself to the life of a gentleman-scholar. Before becoming a contributor to the Encyclopédie, he had already compiled a multi-volume medical dictionary, but the manuscript was lost in a shipwreck. After the publication of volume 1 of the Encyclopédie, Jaucourt contacted the bookseller David and volunteered his services. Over time, the extent of his collaboration dramatically increased, so that, in the end, he wrote about a quarter of the articles in the Encyclopédie. His articles were on a great variety of subjects, including religion, politics, medicine, botany, and the fine arts. Especially after D'Alembert's resignation as co-editor, Jaucourt became a sort of unofficial co-editor. For example, he began introducing biographies in geographical articles in volume 6, thereby contravening Diderot and D'Alembert's initial decision not to include biographies.

== Alphabetical ==
- Antoine-Joseph Dezallier d'Argenville
- Antoine-Gaspard Boucher d'Argis
- Arnulphe d'Aumont
- Jacques-Nicolas Bellin
- Jacques-François Blondel
- Claude Bourgelat
- Jean-François-Henri Collot
- Étienne Noël Damilaville
- Louis-Jean-Marie Daubenton
- Denis Diderot
- César Chesneau Du Marsais
- Marc-Antoine Eidous
- Jean-Baptiste de La Chapelle
- Guillaume Le Blond
- André le Breton
- Georges-Louis Le Sage
- Antoine Louis
- Baron d'Holbach
- Louis de Jaucourt
- Jacques-Raymond Lucotte
- Philippe-Antoine Magimel
- Edmé-François Mallet
- Paul-Jacques Malouin
- Jean-François Marmontel
- Charles de Secondat, Baron de Montesquieu
- Adrien Quiret de Margency
- Jean-Baptiste-Pierre le Romain
- Jean-Jacques Rousseau
- António Nunes Ribeiro Sanches
- Pierre Tarin
- François-Vincent Toussaint
- Anne Robert Jacques Turgot, Baron de Laune
- Urbain de Vandenesse
- Gabriel François Venel
- Suzanne Verdier
- Voltaire
- Claude Yvon

== Number of articles ==
71,818 articles in 17 volumes:

- 37,870 – XXX (unsigned or undetermined)
- 17,288 – Louis de Jaucourt
- 5,394 – Denis Diderot
- 4,268 – Boucher d'Argis
- 1,925 – Edmé-François Mallet
- 1,309 – Jean Le Rond d'Alembert
- 994 – Jacques-Nicolas Bellin
- 720 – Guillaume Le Blond
- 707 – Gabriel François Venel
- 693 – Louis-Jean-Marie Daubenton
- 541 – Antoine-Joseph Dezallier d'Argenville
- 482 – Jacques-François Blondel
- 449 – Antoine Louis
- 428 – Marc-Antoine Eidous
- 414 – Baron d'Holbach
- 388 – François-Vincent Toussaint
- 344 – Jean-Jacques Rousseau
- 337 – Pierre Tarin
- 227 – Claude Bourgelat
- 214 – Jean-Baptiste de La Chapelle
- 199 – Urbain de Vandenesse
- 192 – Arnulphe d'Aumont
- 129 – César Chesneau Du Marsais
- 119 – Cahusac
- 108 – Le Roy
- 107 – Landois
- 91 – Beauzée
- 78 – Paul-Jacques Malouin
- 70 – Jean-Baptiste-Pierre le Romain
- 61 – Louis-Jacques Goussier, also supervisor of the engraved plates
- 56 – Malouin
- 45 – Lenglet Du Fresnoy
- 41 – Daubenton | Diderot
- 39 – Claude Yvon
- 39 – Daubenton | Vandenesse
- 32 – Boucher d'Argis
- 26 – de La Chapelle | d'Alembert
- 26 – Voltaire
- 25 – Diderot | Mallet
- 23 – Daubenton | Jaucourt
- 22 – Daubenton, le Subdelegue
- 21 – Barths
- 20 – Mallet | Diderot
- 20 – Formey
- 20 – Daubenton | Jaucourt
- 14 – Rousseau | d'Alembert
- 14 – Beauzee
- 13 – Watelet
- 13 – Boucher d'Argis
- 12 – Douchet et Beauzee
- 12 – Daubenton | d'Argenville
- 11 – Diderot | Vandenesse
- 10 – Jacques-François de Villiers
- 10 – Marmontel
- 10 – Forbonnais
- 9 – Papillon
- 9 – Mallet | d'Alembert
- 9 – Daubenton | Daubenton, le Subdelegue
- 8 – Faiguet
- 7 – d'Argenville | Diderot
- 7 – Tarin
- 7 – Pestr
- 7 – Jaucourt
- 7 – Bellin | Bellin
- 6 – Vandenesse | Diderot
- 6 – Toussaint | Mallet
- 6 – Durival
- 6 – Beauzee et Duchet
- 5 – d'Aubenton
- 5 – d'Alembert | Diderot
- 5 – Yvon | Diderot
- 5 – Venel | Venel
- 5 – Menuret
- 5 – Mallet | Mallet
- 5 – Diderot | Daubenton
- 5 – Daubenton | d'Argenville | Vandenesse
- 5 – Daubenton | Vandenesse | Diderot
- 5 – C. D. J. | Jaucourt
- 4 – d'Alembert | Mallet
- 4 – Romilly
- 4 – Rallier
- 4 – Louis | Diderot
- 4 – Blondel | Diderot

== By letter ==
In the Encyclopédie, most of the regular authors are identified by a letter at the end of an article. By contrast, irregular contributors were often identified with their full names.

- (A) – Boucher d'Argis
- (a) – Lenglet Du Fresnoy
- (B) – Cahusac
- (b) – Venel
- (C) – Pestré
- (c) – Daubenton, le Subdélégué
- (D) – Goussier
- (d) – d'Aumont
- (E) – de La Chapelle
- (e) – Bourgelat
- (F) – Dumarsais
- (f) – de Villiers
- (G) – Mallet
- (g) – Barthès
- (H) – Toussaint
- (h) – Morellet
- (I) – Daubenton
- (K) – d'Argenville
- (L) – Tarin
- (M) – Malouin
- (m) – Ménuret de Chambaud
- (N) – Vandenesse
- (O) – d'Alembert
- (P) – Blondel
- (Q) – Le Blond
- (R) – Landois
- (S) – Rousseau
- (T) – Le Roy
- (V) – Eidous
- (X) – Yvon
- (Y) – Louis
- (Z) – Bellin
- (*) – Diderot
- (D.J.) – de Jaucourt
- (—) – d'Holbach
- (V.D.F.) – Forbonnais
- (E.R.M.) – Douchet and Beauzée

== See also ==
- Wikipedians
