= Suzanne Verdier =

French writer (1745–1813)

- Born: Suzanne Allut; 1745; Montpellier, France
- Died: 1813 (aged 67–68); Uzès, France
- Occupations: Writer, poet
- Known for: Contributor to the Encyclopédie
- Notable work: Description de la Fontaine de Vaucluse

Suzanne Verdier (1745 – 1813) was a French writer. She was a contributor to the Encyclopédie.

== Biography ==
Suzanne Allut was born in 1745, in Montpellier. At the age of 20, along with her brother Antoine, she collaborated on the Encyclopédie. In Paris, she was educated by the Encyclopédiste priest Jean Pestré, demonstrating an early aptitude for poetry, painting and music. After marrying Mr. Verdier, a rich merchant of Uzès, she provided a thorough education for her children, while reserving time to cultivate her own skills. Many of her poems of the period 1775 to 1787 were contributed to the Almanach des Muses, and were highly appreciated. One of these works, Description de la Fontaine de Vaucluse (Description of the Fountain of Vaucluse), was included in the French poetry collection by Jean-François de La Harpe who said: "And Verdier in the idyll who defeated Deshoulières."

In 1807, Verdier was elected member of the Academy of Nîmes. She was awarded three crowns at the Floral Games, which earned her the title of master of the academy, Consistori del Gay Saber. She was also admitted to the Accademia degli Arcadi, the Academy of Gard, and the Athenaeum of Vaucluse. What is perhaps no less flattering than these public tributes to Verdier was the testimony given in her regard by the literary women of her time, an example being a statement made by Henriette Bourdic-Viot to Adelaide Dufrenoy: "We are a crowd of musettes, Madame Verdier alone is a muse." Verdier left a touching elegy for her brother, Antoine, who was guillotined as a Girondin. She died in 1813 in Uzès after an attack of apoplexy.
