= Jean Pestré =

French theologian and encyclopedist

Jean Pestré, or Pestre, (1723, Saint-Geniez-d'Olt – 1821, Paris) was an 18th–19th-century French theologian.

He worked closely with the two encyclopédistes abbés Claude Yvon and Jean-Martin de Prades. From 1751, all three shared an apartment in Paris and contributed to the first volume published in June 1751 of the Encyclopédie by Diderot and D’Alembert. Abbé Pestré wrote the articles signed "C", baconisme ou philosophie de Bacon, bonheur, cabale, calomnie, Campanella, Canadiens, Cardan, cartésianisme and complaisance for volumes II and III. Marked by the philosophie des Lumières, his articles adopt a sensualist point of view.

Pestre ceased to contribute to the Encyclopédie after the controversy surrounding the theory of the abbot of Prades which saw the temporary exile of the latter and Yvon. It is possible that, remained close to his compatriot abbé Raynal, Pestré contributed anonymously to his Histoire des deux Indes.

He later earned a living by giving private lessons, in particular to Antoine Allut, futur Encyclopédiste.

== Bibliography ==
- Frank Arthur Kafker (1988). The encyclopedists as individuals: a biographical dictionary of the authors of the Encyclopédie. Oxford: Studies on Voltaire and the eighteenth Century. p. 304-6. ISBN 978-0-7294-0368-9. LCCN 89146459.
- Matthias Glötzner: Wissen ist Macht - Die französische Aufklärung im Spiegel der Encyclopédie. Grin-Verlag, Norderstedt (2007) ISBN 3-638-74490-6
