= Urbain de Vandenesse =

French physician and Encyclopédiste

- Died: 1753; Paris, France
- Scientific career
- Fields: Physics

Urbain de Vandenesse (? – 1753, Paris) was an 18th-century French physician and Encyclopédiste.

== Life ==
After he presented six thesis at the Faculté de médecine de Paris, he was received with the title docteur-régent in 1742.

The 270 articles he wrote for the Encyclopédie by Denis Diderot and d’Alembert are the only texts we know of him. There were more than 150 articles for Volume I and about 100 for Volume II; his sudden death interrupted his cooperation for the relevant sections of Volume III for which he could contribute only one article.

After the death of Vandenesse, Diderot needed a new author in the field of medicine and pharmacy. On the recommendation of Gabriel François Venel, he chose Arnulphe d'Aumont.

== Bibliography ==
- Frank Arthur Kafker: The Encyclopedists as individuals: a biographical dictionary of the authors of the Encyclopédie, Oxford 1988, ISBN 0-7294-0368-8
