= Edmé-François Mallet =

French writer (1713–1755)

Edmé-François Mallet, also Edme-Francois Mallet or Abbé Mallet (29 January 1713, Melun – 25 September 1755, Châteaurenard), was an eighteenth-century French theologian and encyclopédiste.

== Biography ==
Edmé-François Mallet received his first education from a country priest in his hometown. Later he studied at the college of the Barnabites in Montargis, before going to Paris, where he trained for the priesthood and earned a doctorate in theology in 1742. While in Paris, he worked as a private tutor, notably with the family of the tax-collector (fermier général) Louis Denis Lalive de Bellegarde (1680-1751).

In 1744, fed up with a later experience of tutoring "great" families, Mallet returned to Melun to become a village priest. There he remained for seven years. In 1747, he published an Essai sur l’étude des belles-lettres. After his mother's death in 1751, he moved back to Paris and took a chair of theology at the Collège de Navarre.

In 1753, he published an Essai sur les bienséances oratoires and Principes pour la lecture des Orateurs in three volumes. In 1754, his Principes pour la lecture des Poëtes was published. He also translated a Histoire de Davila, which was published only after his death. At this time, he began to gather sources for two major projects: Histoire générale de toutes les guerres de France de l’établissement de la monarchie jusqu’à Louis XIV and a History of the Council of Trent.

In November 1747, Mallet had begun his involvement with the French Encyclopédie (1752-72), co-edited by Denis Diderot and Jean le Rond d’Alembert. Working through the end of his life in 1755, Mallet signed more than two thousand articles, with a focus on trade (over 500 articles), religion (over 500 articles), history (over 600 articles), and literature (over 200 articles). His articles represented compilations from previously published texts, including reference works such as Ephraim Chambers’ Cyclopaedia (1728). Thus, his article “Anthropophages” has often been cited as evidence of the anti-religious, subversive quality of the Encyclopédie, namely for its comparison of the Eucharist to cannibalism, but the whole article was clearly translated from Chambers and merely approved by Mallet. After his death, articles continued to appear under his signature, but they may have been altered by Diderot or someone else.

== A Controversy ==
In an article of 1976, Walter Rex argued against the received view of Mallet, namely that he represented an element of moderation among Catholic clergymen, one who had been deliberately recruited by Diderot and D’Alembert. Rather, Rex speculated, Mallet may have been a “Trojan horse” in the service of Jean-François Boyer, the bishop of Mirepoix, a bitter enemy of the Jansenists and the philosophes: “we may conclude that this protégé of the former bishop of Mirepoix was deliberately subversive to the 'enlightened' objectives of the Encyclopédie, in fact he was serving the reactionary element of the French clergy.”

Rex’s views were contested by Frank Kafker. Kafker pointed out that Mallet was recruited to work on the Encyclopédie just a month after Diderot and D’Alembert were appointed editors, at which time the Encyclopédie did not have a reputation for being critical of religion. Furthermore, Mallet behaved “moderately” in some ways, condemning the St. Bartholomew’s Day massacre and upholding a hearing for the condemned contributor Claude Yvon, for example. Finally, Diderot had “cordial” relations with Mallet, and D’Alembert praised him as a moderate, albeit with exaggeration.

More recently, Reginald McGinnis has pointed out that research on the Encyclopédie over the past several decades has invalidated much of Rex’s original argument. In particular, quite a few of the articles in the Encyclopédie that Rex citied as evidence of Mallet's reactionary or ultra-orthodox character turn out to have been copied from Chambers’ Cyclopaedia. Furthermore, McGinnis’s own research suggests that Mallet’s published articles on the Jansenists, for example, were in tune with those of D’Alembert and other philosophes.

== Main works ==
- 1747: Essai sur l’étude des belles-lettres
- 1753: Principes pour la lecture des orateurs.
- 1753: Essai sur les bienséances oratoires

== Bibliography ==
- Gerhardt Stenger, « Recherches nouvelles sur l’Encyclopédie », Recherches sur Diderot et sur l’Encyclopédie, 60, 2025, p. 169-208 (particularly p. 178-192).
- John Rogister: Louis XV and the Parlement of Paris, 1737-55. Cambridge University Press (2010) ISBN 0-5218-9336-4 S. 241
- Dorothy Caiger Senghas: The Abbé Mallet: contributor to the Encyclopédie. Davis, University of California (1968), Dissertation
