= Marc-Michel Rey =

Dutch publisher of Genevan origin (1720–1780)

- Born: 5 May 1720; Geneva, Republic of Geneva
- Died: 8 June 1780 (aged 60); Amsterdam, Dutch Republic
- Spouse: Elisabeth Bernard (m. 1747)

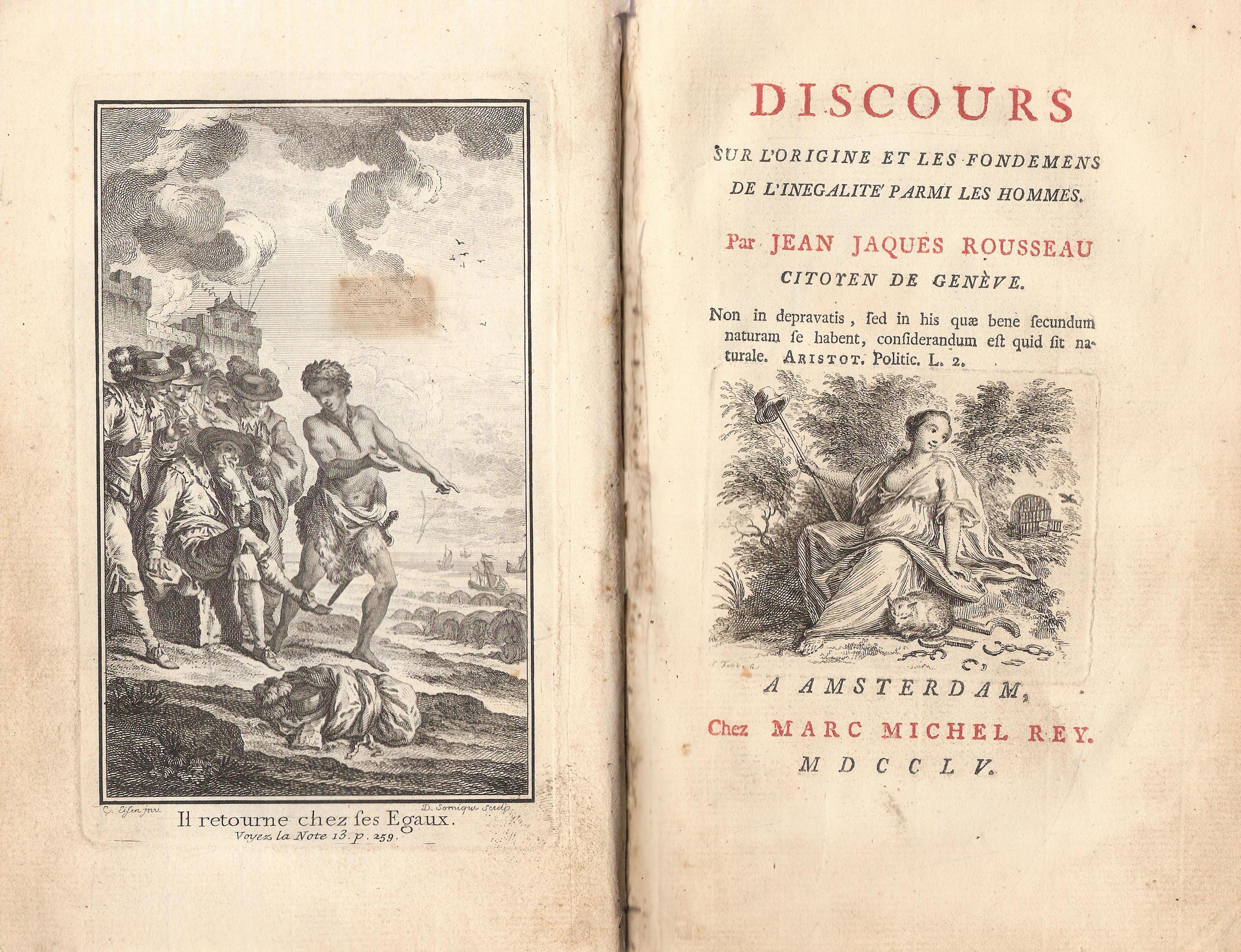
Title page of Marc Michel Rey's 1755 edition of "Discours sur l’origine et les fondemens de l’inégalité parmi les hommes" by Jean-Jacques Rousseau.

Marc-Michel Rey (French: [ʁɛ]; 5 May 1720 – 8 June 1780) was a Geneva-born bookseller and publisher based in Amsterdam. He became one of the leading publishers of French-language literature in the Dutch Republic and is particularly known as the principal publisher of Jean-Jacques Rousseau, with whom he maintained a long and sometimes difficult working relationship. Rey also published works by Beaumelle, Diderot, Baron d'Holbach, Voltaire and Marat, distributing French-language books throughout Europe.

== Life ==
Rey was the son of French Huguenot parents from the Dauphiné. He later wrote that he had received little formal schooling. He was trained in the book trade in Geneva, where he was apprenticed to the bookseller Marc-Michel Bousquet, for whom his father had also worked. After moving to Amsterdam in 1744, Rey became a citizen of the city in 1746 and was admitted to the booksellers' guild. At the time of his engagement he lived in the Kalverstraat.

In 1747, Rey married the daughter of the Amsterdam bookseller Jean-Frédéric Bernard, who had died in 1744. Rey had assisted in winding up Bernard's business and took over part of his stock. Elisabeth (1723-1778) brought both capital and experience in the book trade to the marriage; she also handled Dutch-language business correspondence, as Rey never became fluent in Dutch.

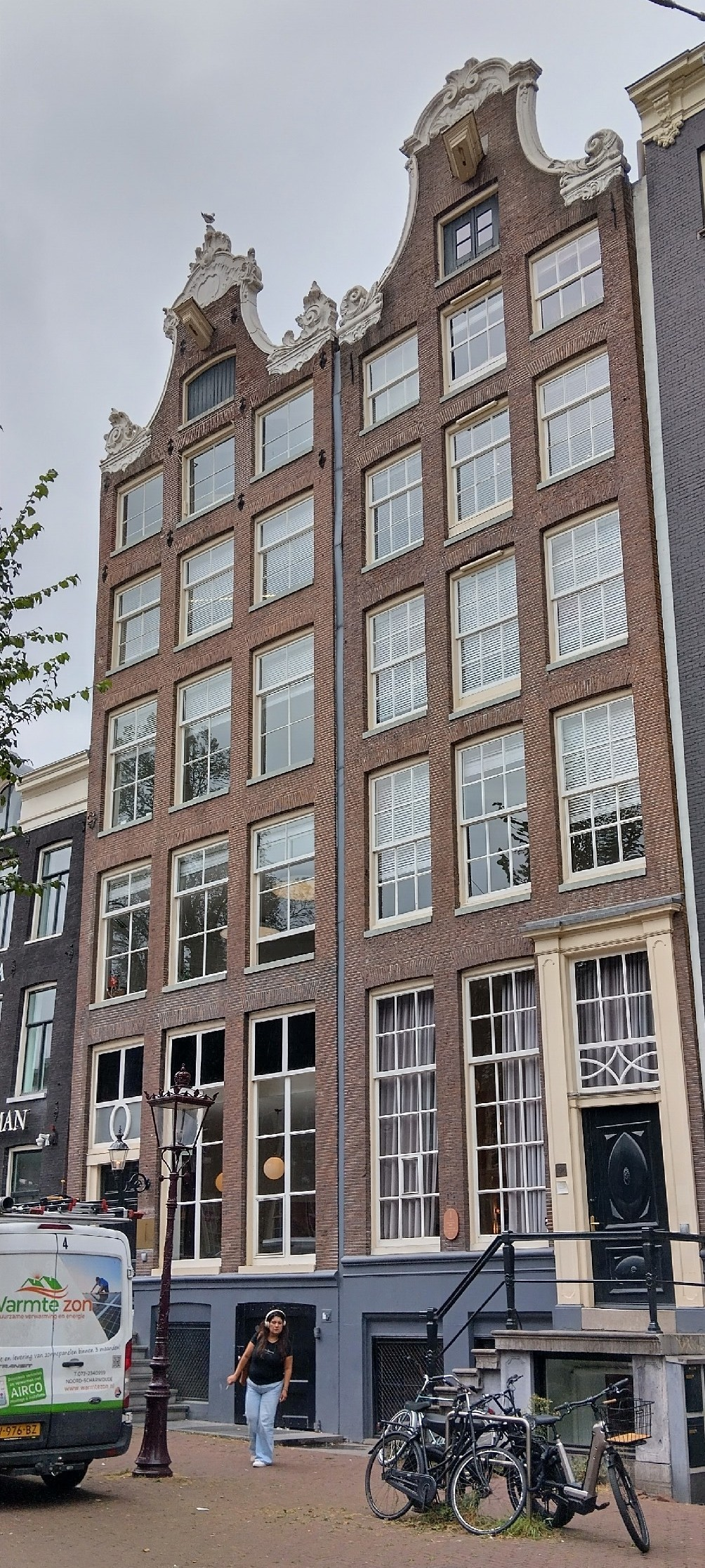
The house on the right (296) is where the publisher Marc Michel Rey lived and worked.

In the 1750s Rey lived and worked at Rokin. He later established his business at Nieuwezijds Voorburgwal 296, where the upper floors were used for the storage of books.

Rey and his wife had several children; their daughter Susanne Madelaine Jeanne was baptized in May 1762, with Jean-Jacques Rousseau acting as godfather. The eldest, Isaac, assisted his father and later settled in Demarara. Rey was buried on 13 June 1780 at the Leidse Kerkhof; his funeral procession included four coaches.

== Publishing career ==
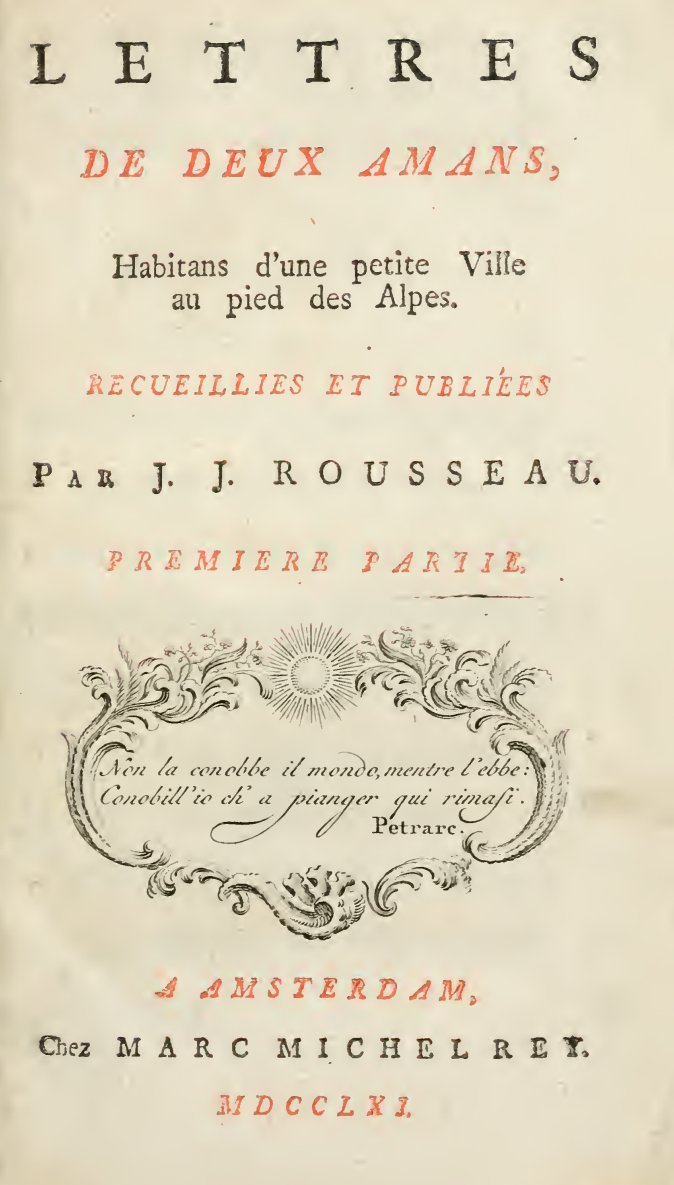
First edition title page from Rousseau's Julie, or the New Heloise (1761)

Rey's first publications under his own name appeared in 1746. He specialized in French-language publishing and developed an extensive commercial network extending across Europe and into the Dutch overseas colonies. Although based in Amsterdam, he largely remained outside the Dutch-language book market. His business included original editions as well as inexpensive reprints of successful works published elsewhere in Europe.

From 1749 until his death, Rey published an Amsterdam edition of the Journal des sçavans. Rather than simply reproducing the Paris periodical, he supplemented it with scientific and literary news from elsewhere in Europe. The journal provided Rey with a means of circulating information through an international network of authors, booksellers and correspondents, while also serving to advertise publications from his own business.

Rey's reputation became particularly associated with Rousseau, whose principal publisher he became. He published Discours sur l'origine et les fondements de l'inégalité parmi les hommes in 1755, followed by Julie, ou la Nouvelle Héloïse in 1761 and Du contrat social in 1762. Their extensive correspondence concerned manuscripts, printing, distribution, profits and the rights to Rousseau's works. Chrétien-Guillaume de Lamoignon de Malesherbes, who directed the French administration of the book trade, facilitated the publication of Julie by allowing Rousseau to use the diplomatic post to send proofs between France and Amsterdam.

Julie became an extraordinary publishing success and was repeatedly reprinted. In April 1762, Rey formally acknowledged the commercial importance of his relationship with Rousseau in an Amsterdam notarial deed. Expressing his gratitude for the profits Rousseau's works had brought him, he granted Rousseau's companion Thérèse Levasseur a lifelong annual payment of 300 French livres.

The publication of Rousseau's works repeatedly brought Rey into conflict with religious and secular authorities. After Rousseau's works were condemned in France in 1762, Rey continued to publish him, including the Lettre à Christophe de Beaumont in 1763 and the Lettres écrites de la montagne in 1764. It was Rey who urged Rousseau to put his memoirs in writing. The result was his autobiography, Confessions. His publishing activities brought him under pressure from French, Dutch and Genevan authorities as well as from the board of Amsterdam's Walloon church.

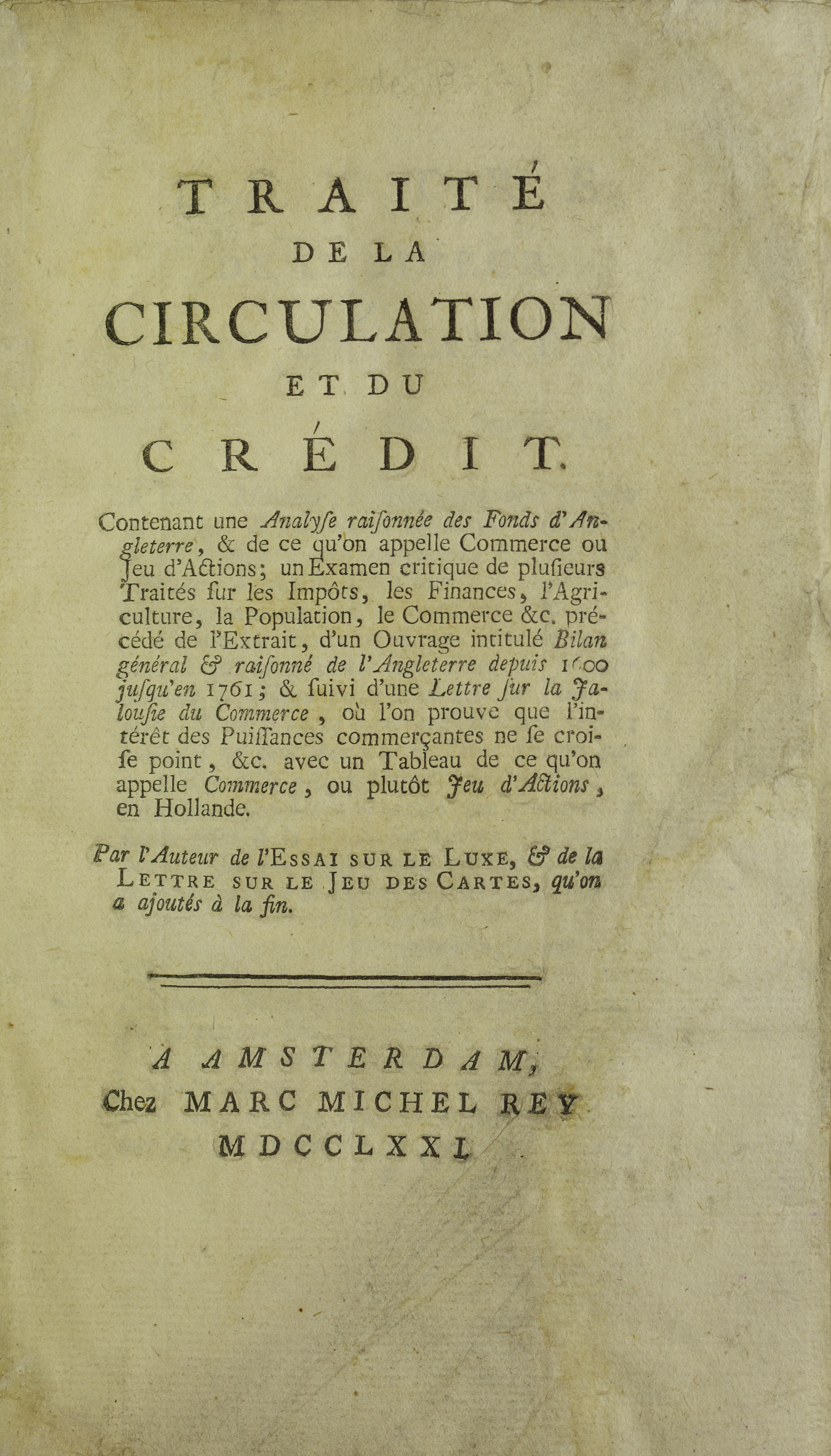
Traité de la circulation et du crédit (1771) by Isaac de Pinto, published by Rey

Rey also attracted authors who came to Amsterdam in search of access to the international French-language book market. In 1774, Jean-Paul Marat travelled to Amsterdam to arrange the publication of a French version of his philosophical work; Rey published the substantially expanded three-volume De l'Homme in 1775–76. The former Encyclopédie contributor Abbé Claude Yvon also worked for Rey.

In 1776, Mirabeau, who had fled France with Sophie de Monnier, settled nearby under an assumed name. Mirabeau supported himself in Amsterdam partly by undertaking translations and other literary work for booksellers and subsequently worked for Rey.

Rey's business extended far beyond Amsterdam. His books were distributed throughout Europe, including Russia, and in the Dutch overseas colonies (Surinam). His son Isaac participated in the overseas side of the business. By combining an international distribution network with French-language periodicals and the publication of controversial authors, Rey became one of the principal Amsterdam publishers of the later Enlightenment.

== Sources ==
- Barbier, Frédéric; Martin, Henri-Jean (1997). "Marc-Michel Rey 1720-1780". Ecole pratique des hautes études, IVe section, Sciences historiques et philologiques. Librairie Droz. ISBN 2-600-00198-0.
- Bonnant, Georges (1999). Le livre genevois sous l'Ancien Régime. Librairie Droz. ISBN 2-600-00306-1.
- Cranston, Maurice William (1991). The noble savage: Jean-Jacques Rousseau, 1754-1762. University of Chicago Press. p. 5. ISBN 0-226-11864-9.
- Holbach, Paul Henri Thiry (1997). Histoire critique de Jésus Christ, ou, Analyse raisonnée des Évangiles. Librairie Droz. ISBN 2-600-00231-6.
