= Magimel =

Magimel is a surname. Notable people with the surname include:

- Benoît Magimel (born 1974), French actor
- Philippe-Antoine Magimel (1692–1772), French goldsmith and encyclopédiste

== See also ==
- Maginel Wright Enright (1881–1966), American children's book illustrator and graphic artist, sister of Frank Lloyd Wright
- Magh Mela, also spelled Magha mela, Hindu and Sikh annual festivals
