= Encyclopedist =

Encyclopedist may refer to:

- A person who contributes content to any encyclopedia.
- One of the Encyclopedists, the contributors to the Encyclopédie (France, 1751–1772), the first encyclopedia with signed contributions from numerous collaborators.
