= Collot =

Collot (English: /kɒˈloʊ/, French: [kɔlo]) is a French surname. Notable people called Collot include:

- Georges Henri Victor Collot (1750–1805), French general, colonial administrator, and Governor of Guadeloupe
- Jean-François-Henri Collot (1716–1804), 18th-century French homme de lettres and contributor to the Encyclopédie
- Jean-Marie Collot d'Herbois (1749–1796), French actor, dramatist, essayist, and leading revolutionary during the French Revolution
- Liane Collot d'Herbois (1907–1999), British painter and anthroposophical painting therapist
- Marie-Anne Collot (1748–1821), French sculptor, best known for her portrait busts and association with the sculptor Étienne Maurice Falconet
- Patrick Collot (born 1967), French football manager and former professional player
- Serge Collot (1923–2015), French violist, chamber musician, and music educator

== See also ==
- Élisabeth Collot (1903–2013), French supercentenarian
- Collot d'Herbois (family name variant)
- Collet (similar surname)
