= Philippe-Antoine Magimel =

French goldsmith and encyclopédiste

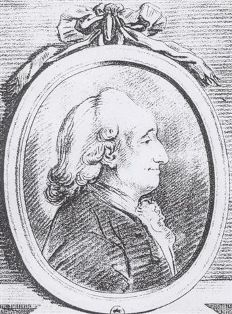
Portrait of Maginel

Philippe-Antoine Magimel (1692 – 5 October 1772, Paris) was a French goldsmith and encyclopédiste.

He was the son of the master goldsmith Antoine Magimel († 1702) from Paris and Marie-Françoise Leblond (1667–1756). Philippe-Antoine Magimel was married to Elisabeth-Marguerite Descoties († 1770), the couple had two children Antoine-Edouard and Augustin-Simon Magimel.

He wrote the articles Orfèvrerie and Orfèvre for the Encyclopédie by Denis Diderot.
