= Jacques-Raymond Lucotte =

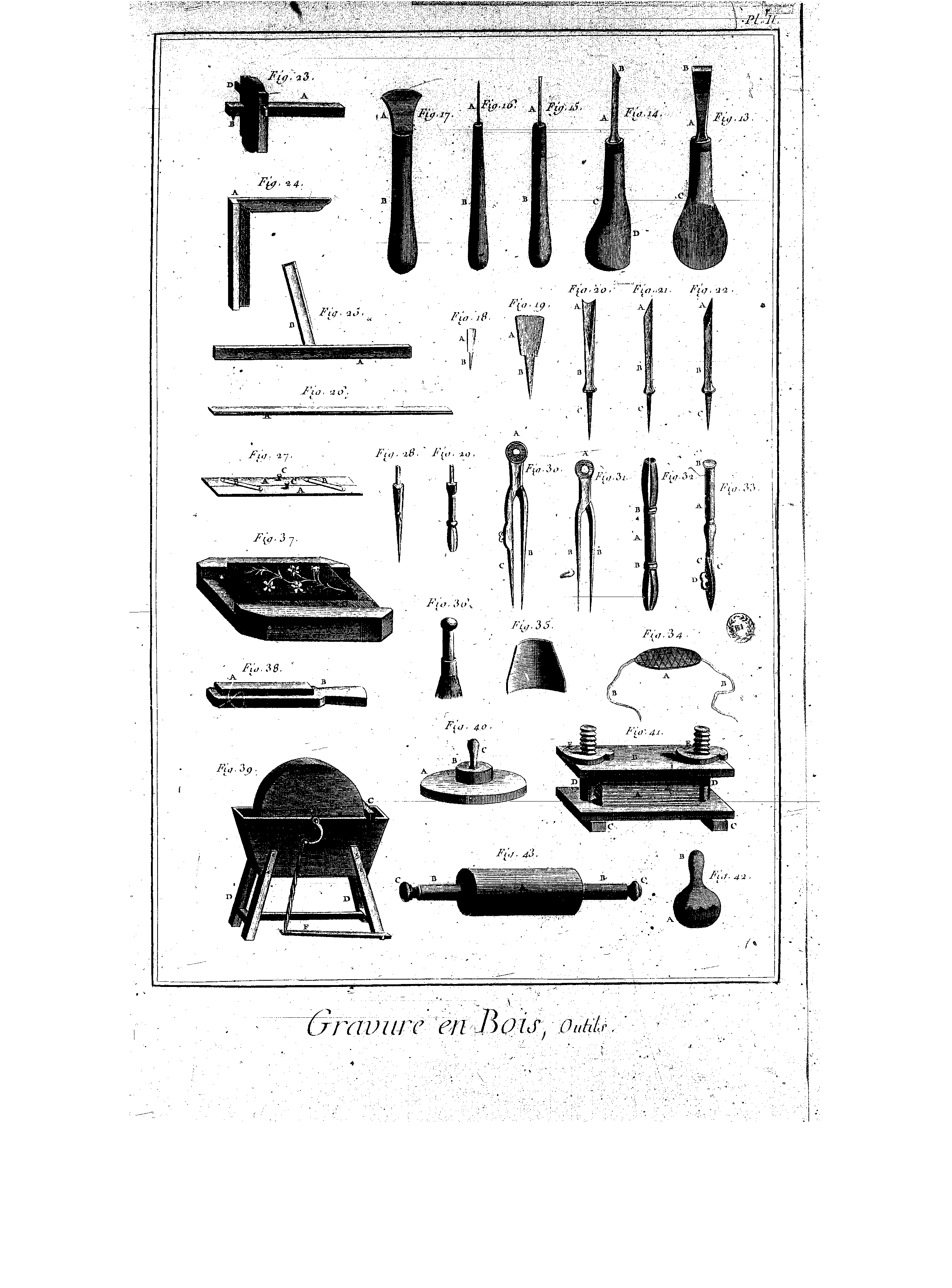
Planche Gravure en Bois, outils du vol. IV of the Encyclopédie to which Jacques-Raymond Lucotte contributed.

Jacques-Raymond Lucotte was an 18th-century French architect and encyclopedist.

A former student of the Académie royale d'architecture, Lucotte wrote the articles "maçonnerie", "marbrier", "marqueterie", "menuiserie", "mosaïque (art. méchaniques)", "plomberie", "pont, des machines", "fleuriste", "formier", "tourbissure", "ganterie" and "serrurerie" in the volumes IX to XVII of the Encyclopédie by Diderot and D’Alembert. He also provided more than 45 comments and over 650 drawings to the plate volumes.

Lucotte left two works:

- le Vignole moderne, ou Traité élémentaire d’architecture (3 vol., Paris, 1772–1784)
- l’Art de la maçonnerie (Paris, 1783)

== Sources ==
- Frank Arthur Kafker, The Encyclopedists as individuals: a biographical dictionary of the authors of the Encyclopédie, Oxford, Studies on Voltaire and the eighteenth Century, 1988, p. 235-7. ISBN 0-7294-0368-8.
- Reed Benhamou, « The Sincerest Form of flattery: the professional life of J. R. Lucotte », Studies on Voltaire, n° 249, 1987, p. 381-97.
