= Antoine-Gaspard Boucher d'Argis =

French lawyer

- Born: 3 April 1708; Lyon, Kingdom of France
- Died: 25 January 1791 (aged 82); Paris, Kingdom of France
- Occupations: Lawyer, publisher, writer
- Known for: Encyclopédie

Antoine-Gaspard Boucher d'Argis (3 April 1708 in Lyon – 25 January 1791 in Paris) was a French lawyer. He contributed 4268 entries to Diderot and d'Alembert's Encyclopédie on legal subjects.

Boucher d'Argis was born in Paris and worked with his lawyer father. Advisor to the Supreme Council of Dombes in 1753 then at the Châtelet in Paris Boucher d'Argis wrote a number of legal treatises and published the Règles pour former un avocat (Rules of form of a lawyer) of Pierre Biarnoy de Merville in a "re-touched" edition with the Histoire abrégée de l'ordre des avocats.

Beginning in 1742 he began to publish new editions of the Recueil, par ordre alphabétique, des principales questions de droit (Collection, in alphabetical order, of the principal questions of law) by Barthélemy-Joseph Bretonnier (1656–1727). Beginning in 1749 he also offered new editions of Dictionnaire de droit et de pratique by Claude de Ferrière (1639–1715). He also provided 4,268 articles on the law for the Encyclopédie Vols. III through XVII including the article on sodomy. He continued to help Diderot even after the banning of the wok in 1758. In 1767 he served as Alderman of Paris.

His son was André-Jean Boucher d'Argis, a royalist during the Revolution, who was executed in 1794.

== Publications ==
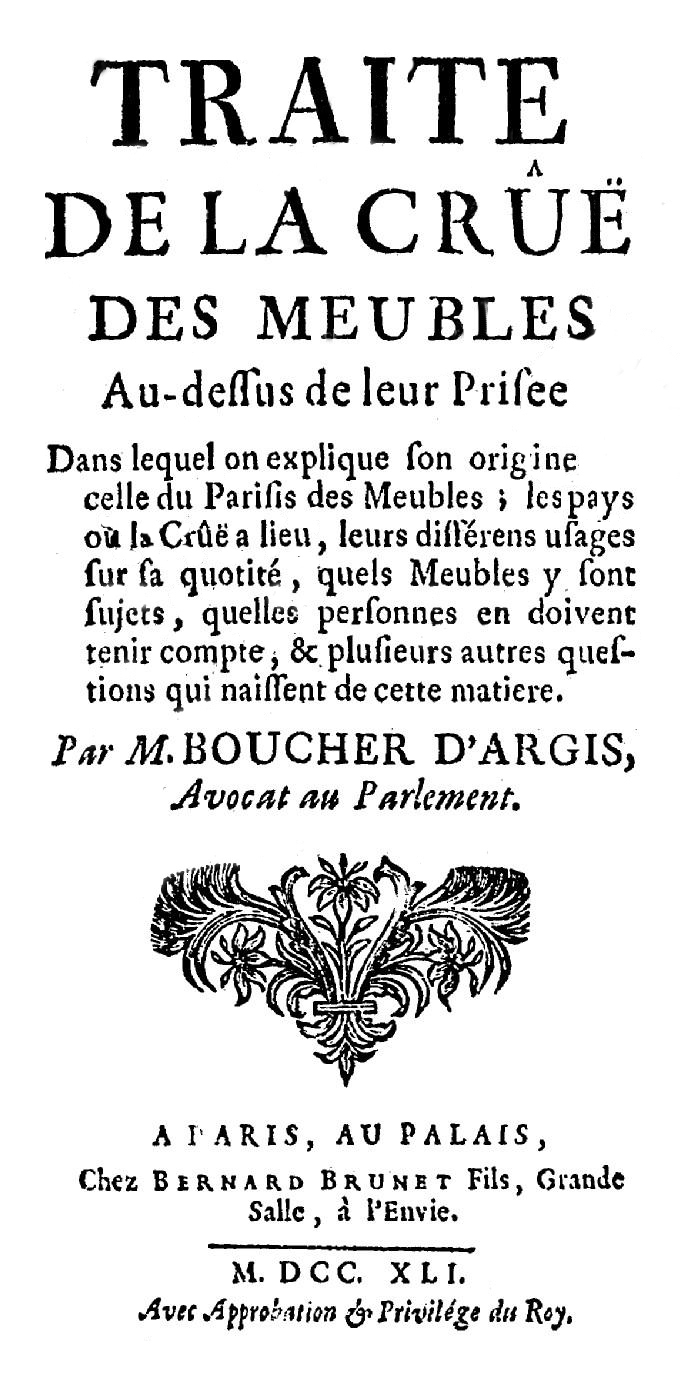
Frontispice du Traité de la crûë, 1741

- Traité des gains nuptiaux et de survie, qui sont en usage dans les païs de droit écrit, tant du ressort du parlement de Paris, que des autres parlemens, Lyon : chez Duplain Père & Fils, 1738 Text online
- Traité de la cruë des meubles au-dessus de leur prisée, dans lequel on explique son origine, & celle du parisis des meubles; les pays où la crûe a lieu; leur différens usages sur la quotité; quels meubles y sont sujets; quelles personnes en doivent tenir compte; & plusieurs autres questions qui naissent de cette matière, Paris, Brunet fils, 1741 Text online & Paris, Saugrain, 1768. In-12
- Code rural, ou Maximes et réglemens concernant les biens de campagne, la chasse, la pêche, les baux, les troupeaux et bestiaux…, Paris, Prault père, 1749 et 1762, 2 vol. in-12; 1774, 3 vol. in-12, XLI-387, 392 et 459 p. Tome I en ligne – Tome II online – Tome III en ligne; éd. en 1794, 3 vol. in-12
- Principes sur la nullité du mariage, pour cause d'impuissance, [London], 1756 Text online
