= Marc-Antoine Eidous =

French writer, translator and Encyclopedist

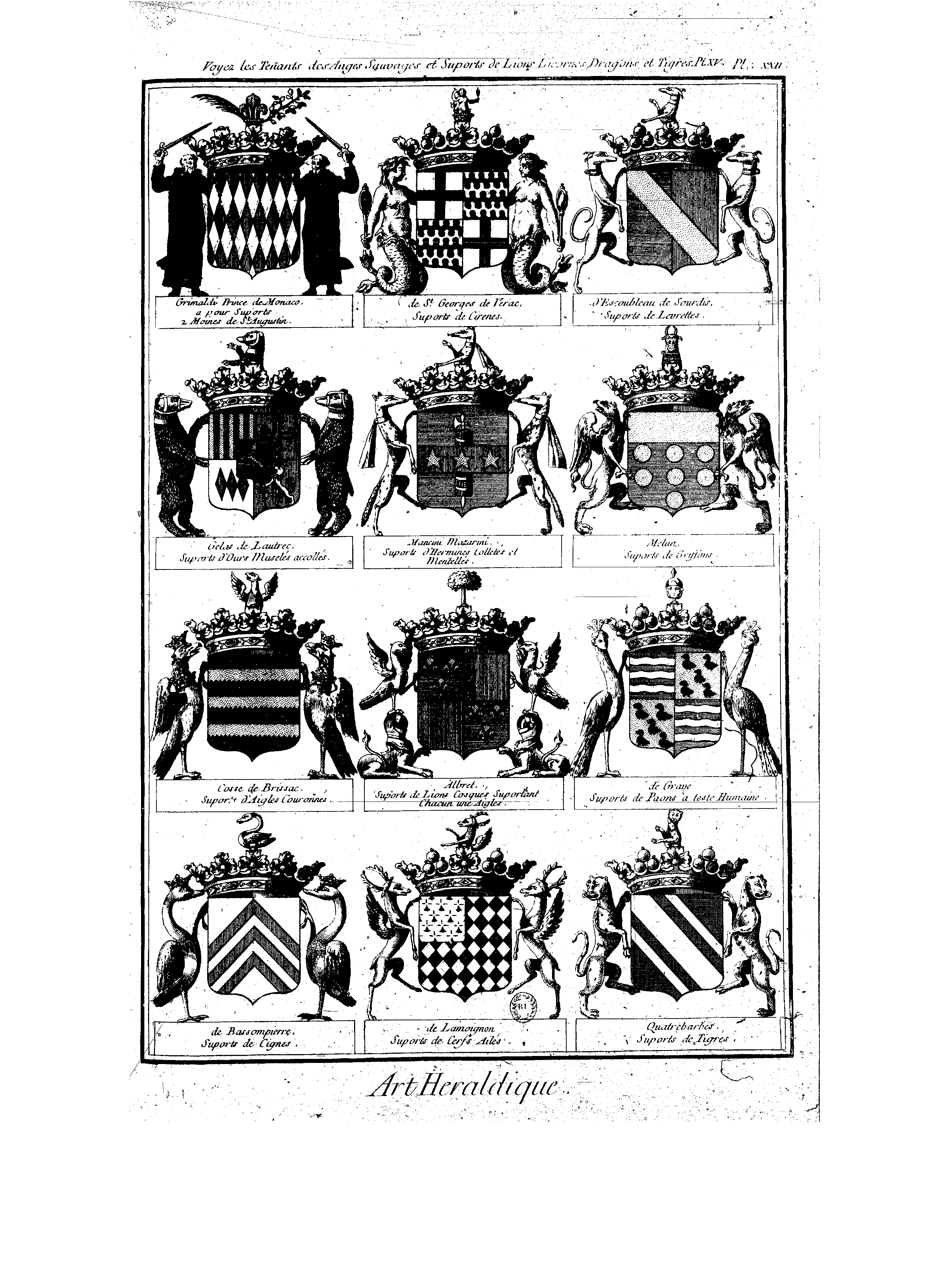
Planche Art héraldique de l’Encyclopédie, vol. II

Marc-Antoine Eidous (1715–c.1790) was a French writer, translator and Encyclopedist born in Marseille.

Marc-Antoine Eidous – or Eydoux – was born in Marseille on 18 February 1715 and was baptised the next day at St. Martin. His death date remains to be checked.

His translations included works on the subjects of philosophy, travel and agriculture by English and Scottish authors:

- The Dictionnaire universel de médecine (Paris, 1746–1748, 6 folio volumes) with Denis Diderot, Julien Busson and François-Vincent Toussaint from the Medicinal Dictionary of Robert James
- Reflexions sur l'Origine des Nations, tirées de leur langage, (1750);
- Histoire de la poésie (1764), by John Brown
- Métaphysique de l'âme, ou Théorie des sentiments moraux (1764), translating The Theory of Moral Sentiments (1759) by Adam Smith
- Agriculture complète, ou l'Art d'améliorer les terres (1765) from The whole art of husbandry, or, the way of managing and improving of land (1707) by John Mortimer
- The Voyages depuis S. Pétersbourg en Russie dans diverses contrées de l'Asie... (1766), from Travels from St. Petersburg in Russia, to diverse parts of Asia (1764) by John Bell
- The Œuvres philosophiques (Philosophical Works) of Francis Hutcheson
- Dissertation historique et politique sur la population de l'ancien tems comparée ace celle du nôtre (Amsterdam, 1769), from Robert Wallace's A Dissertation on the Numbers of Mankind in Ancient and Modern Times (1753)

Eidous also contributed to the Encyclopédie, including an entry on heraldry (blason).
