= Claude Yvon =

French encyclopédiste

The Abbé Claude Yvon (15 April 1714 – November 1791) was a French encyclopédiste and savant who contributed to the Encyclopédie edited by Denis Diderot and Jean le Rond d'Alembert.

== Early career ==
Yvon was born in Mamers, Maine on the border with Normandy on 15 April 1714. Nothing is known about his early life, except that he received holy orders before moving to Paris. There he made a poor living as a teacher at the Sorbonne, preparing students for their exams, and wrote several anonymous works.

His first works published under his own name were articles in the Encyclopédie on Ame (Soul), Atheé (Atheism), Dieu (God) and several others. In these articles, Yvon gives many arguments in favour of the soul and of God, but proposes that the best arguments are the natural or philosophical ones.

The apparently harmless articles attracted the attention of the official controllers of the philosophical press, who notified the advocate-general, Omer Joly de Fleury. Joly de Fleury wrote a violent indictment of the articles, particularly that on the Soul, which he said was infected with atheism. Voltaire responded by saying the article was one of the worst in the book, but that, contrary to the accusation, it did not stop materialism but in fact made every effort to oppose materialism. However, in the eyes of the church, Yvon, by appealing to rationalist arguments, was in effect an atheist.

== Later career ==
Yvon was suspected of contributing to a controversial thesis published in 1752 by Jean-Martin de Prades, and fled to Holland to avoid the storm. While there, he was employed by the publisher Marc-Michel Rey as a corrector. The records of an Amsterdam masonic lodge record him speaking on the virtues of the philosopher. The third volume of the Encyclopédie noted that "M. l'abbé Yvon ... est absent". However, his unsigned articles continued to appear in the Encyclopédie.

He did not move from the Dutch Republic to Berlin, as stated in some articles, but to Liège, where he assisted Pierre Rousseau in producing the Journal Encyclopédique. However, the articles of this periodical were not appreciated by the clergy of Liège, and Rousseau and Yvon both fled the country in September 1759. They were invited to Brussels by the count Charles de Cobenz, the minister of the Austrian State in Brussels. When Rousseau moved to Bouillon, Yvon continued his journalistic activities and contributed to the periodicals of Jean-Henri Maubert de Gouvest.

In 1754, Yvon's book La Liberté de conscience resserrée dans les bornes légitimes ("Freedom of conscience confined within legitimate bounds") was published in London in three volumes. In this book he argued that all religions were naturally intolerant and would attack their enemies, but that civil society should be tolerant of those who disagreed with the religious leaders.

Yvon returned to France at the start of 1762. In 1763, Marc-Michel Rey in Amsterdam published a letter from Yvon answering some of Rousseau's criticisms of the Church, and more followed in the ensuing years. The tone of these letters was unexpected to those who had accused him of atheism, but was consistent with his other writings. He accused Rousseau of saying that no laws were good and no governments fair. He also noted that, after making reckless personal attacks on religion and government, things sacred to all people, Rousseau was unrealistic in expecting no outrage against his views.

At the beginning of 1767, Yvon became the editor of the Journal de l'Agriculture. The first two volumes of Yvon's ecclesiastical history appeared in 1778, published in Amsterdam, titled Discours généraux et raisonnés sur l'histoire de l'Église ("General and reasoned discourse on the history of the Church"). Ten more volumes were intended to follow, but did not appear. The first two volumes drew the attention of the police, who raised the issue with the authorities, resulting in a ban on publication of the third volume. This caused a scandal in the press, and Yvon offered to make any corrections that the censor demanded, but to no avail.

Yvon died in Paris in November 1789. At the time of his death he was historian of the Comte d'Artois.

In retrospect, Yvon had great influence on the Encyclopédie. He was described by one historian as the metaphysician of Diderot's great work.

== Articles ==
Yvon wrote or contributed to many articles in the Encyclopédie, which reflected his philosophy. He discussed the Amusement philosophique sur le language des bêtes (Philosophical Amusements on the Language of the Animals) by Guillaume-Hyacinthe Bougeant, treating it as an example of witty and redescriptive rhetoric.

In his article on "Aristotelianism", he said that Pietro Pomponazzi had "no God other than Aristotle". He could not accept that Pomponazzi could believe in Christian dogma while presenting a philosopher's views of immortality, determinism and miracles.

Adam Smith criticized Yvon's article on "Amour" (love) as being too declamatory. He said of the article that it "will tend little to the edification either of the learned or the unlearned reader, and might, one should think, have been omitted even in an Encyclopedia of all arts, sciences and trades".

In Yvon's article on "Freedom", he said that, if man is free, he has a spirit. If he has a spirit, he is immortal. If he is immortal, he can have only God as his author. God must therefore be his judge, punishing him for his vices and rewarding him for his virtues. He concluded that liberty would be repugnant to all who chose to live independent of God.

== Bibliography ==
- Liberté de conscience resserrée dans des bornes légitimes, London, 1754–55, 3 parts, in-8°.
- Two Lettres à Rousseau, pour servir de réponse à sa lettre contre le mandement de l'archevêque de Paris; Amsterdam, 1763, in-8°.
- Discours généraux et rationnés sur l'histoire de l'Église, Amsterdam (Paris), 1768, 3 vol. in-12.
- Accord de la philosophie avec la religion, prouvé par une suite de discours relatifs à treize époques, Paris, 1776, in-12, et 1782 ou 1785, 2 vol. in-8°.
