= François-Vincent Toussaint =

French writer

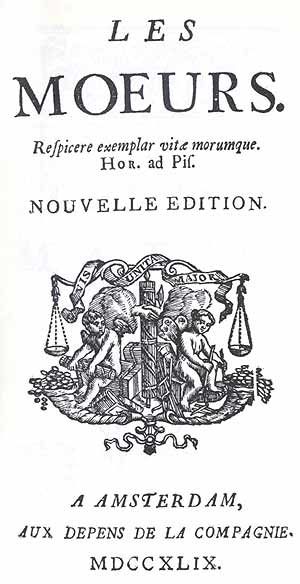
Title page of "Les Mœurs" (1748) by François-Vincent Toussaint

François-Vincent Toussaint (21 December 1715 – 22 June 1772) was a French writer most famous for Les Mœurs (The Manners). The book was published in 1748 and banned the same year; it was prosecuted and burned by the French court of justice.

Toussaint was born in Paris and studied to become a lawyer, but he always worked in the book trade. He worked with Denis Diderot and Marc-Antoine Eidous on a French translation of Dr. Robert James's A Medicinal Dictionary (the London publication of 1743-1745, fol. 3 vols, became Dictionnaire universel de medicine, published in Paris 1746-1748, fol. 6 vols). He contributed to the first volumes of the Encyclopédie of Diderot and Jean le Rond d'Alembert. He translated Tobias Smollett's The Adventures of Peregrine Pickle, and composed the table of contents for a 1749 edition of Montesquieu's De l'esprit des lois (The Spirit of Law).

He was fortunate when his novel Les Mœurs was issued, because he was acquainted with the minister of the Navy, Maurepas. The book was a scandal (and a huge success, reprinted 13 times in the first year) for several reasons, including the fact that one of the treatise's characters was assumed to be based on the oversanctimonious queen Marie Leszczynska. Parisian reader Edmond Jean François Barbier wrote in his diary that Les Mœurs had been banned and he would now have to pay double the normal price for the book.

Toussaint finally got into trouble because of his book in 1757, during the period when Robert Damiens attempted to assassinate Louis XV. This was the moment when Les Mœurs came to be regarded as a book that could lead to regicide. Also Toussaint illegally sold 400 copies of an illegal reprint of Claude Adrien Helvétius's De l'esprit. He left France then, traveling first to Brussels. He published an Éclaircissement (Explanation) of Les Mœurs in 1763, in which he showed that everyone was mistaken and the book was not at all offensive.

In 1764 he moved to Berlin. He had become an external member of the Prussian Academy of Science in 1751, but once he was settled in Berlin he was appointed a regular member of the Academy. During this time he also worked as a teacher in a military school recently founded by Frederick the Great.

When he died in 1772, he was quite poor, leaving behind a wife and several children.

As for Les Mœurs, even if it were his biggest success, he felt sorry for having written it almost all his life. Parts of the book were re-used in several articles of the Encyclopédie.

== Literature ==
A short summary is to be found in

- The Encyclopedists as individuals: a biographical dictionary of the authors of the Encyclopédie by Frank A. Kafker and Serena L. Kafker. Published 1988 in the Studies of Voltaire and the Eighteenth century. ISBN 0-7294-0368-8

It is basically an excerpt of a more extended discussion, the unpublished thesis of

- Margaret Elinor Adams: François Vincent Toussaint: Life and Works. Dissertation, Boston University Graduate School 1966

Adams corrects several flaws and errors in previous research on Toussaint by

- Toussaint, François-Vincent: Anecdotes curieuses de la cour de France sous la régne de Louis XV. Texte original publié pour la première fois avec une notice et des annotations par Paul Fould. Paris: Plon 1905
