= Jean-Baptiste-Pierre le Romain =

18th century French engineer and content contributor

Jean-Baptiste-Pierre Le Romain (dates of birth and death unknown) was a French engineer and contributor to the Encyclopédie during the eighteenth century and the Age of Enlightenment.

Living in Martinique, in 1734 Le Romain drew up a topographic map of the island for the French government. In 1740 he was sent as an assistant engineer to improve the fortifications of the island of Grenada, where he was appointed chief engineer in 1748.

Le Romain provided nearly seventy articles on the Caribbean between volumes III and XVI of the Encyclopédie of Diderot and D'Alembert. More than half of his articles are short descriptions of production, animals, minerals and geography of the Caribbean islands. He provided more detail of the production of regional products such as indigo, sugar and foods derived from cassava. Le Romain also wrote the entry for 'negroes' which reflects the colonial prejudices against blacks, referring to them as "barbarians".

A competent naturalist, Le Romain's contributions gave Diderot and d'Alembert first-hand information on the Caribbean and thus an expanded view of the world for their Encyclopédie.
