= Jean-Baptiste de La Chapelle =

French priest, mathematician and inventor

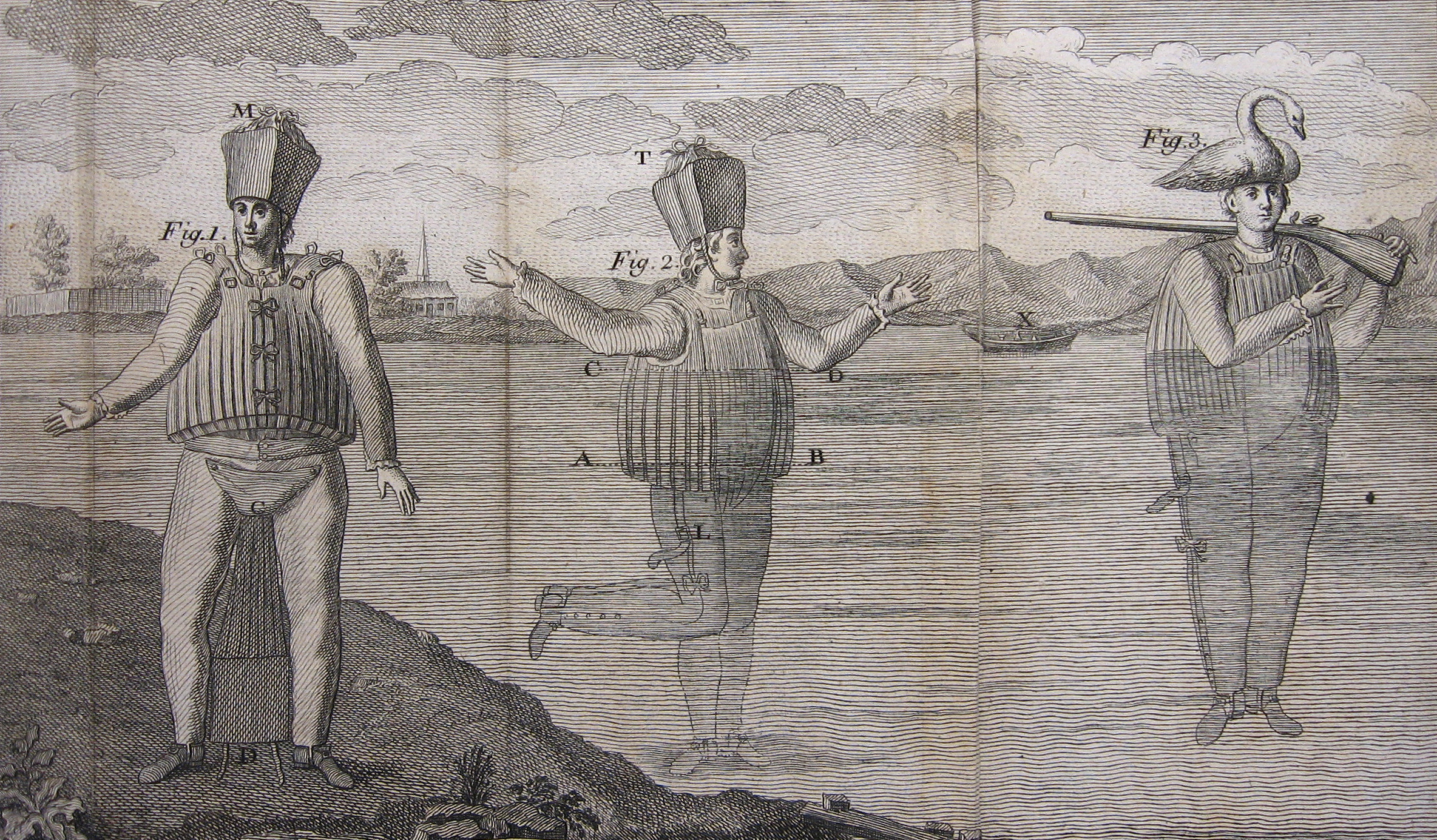
Engraving showing the diving suit conceived by La Chapelle.

Jean-Baptiste de La Chapelle (c.1710–1792, Paris) was a French priest, mathematician and inventor.

He contributed 270 articles to the Encyclopédie in the subjects of arithmetic and geometry. In June 1747 he was elected a Fellow of the Royal Society of London.

He was the inventor of a primitive diving suit in 1775, which he called a "scaphandre" from the Greek words skaphe (boat) and andros (man) in his book Traité de la construction théorique et pratique du scaphandre ou du bateau de l'homme (Treatise on the theoretical and practical construction of the "Scaphandre" or human boat). The invention of the Abbé de la Chapelle consisted of a suit made of cork which allowed soldiers to float and swim in water. As the name and description suggest, it was more of a flotation suit than a diving suit.

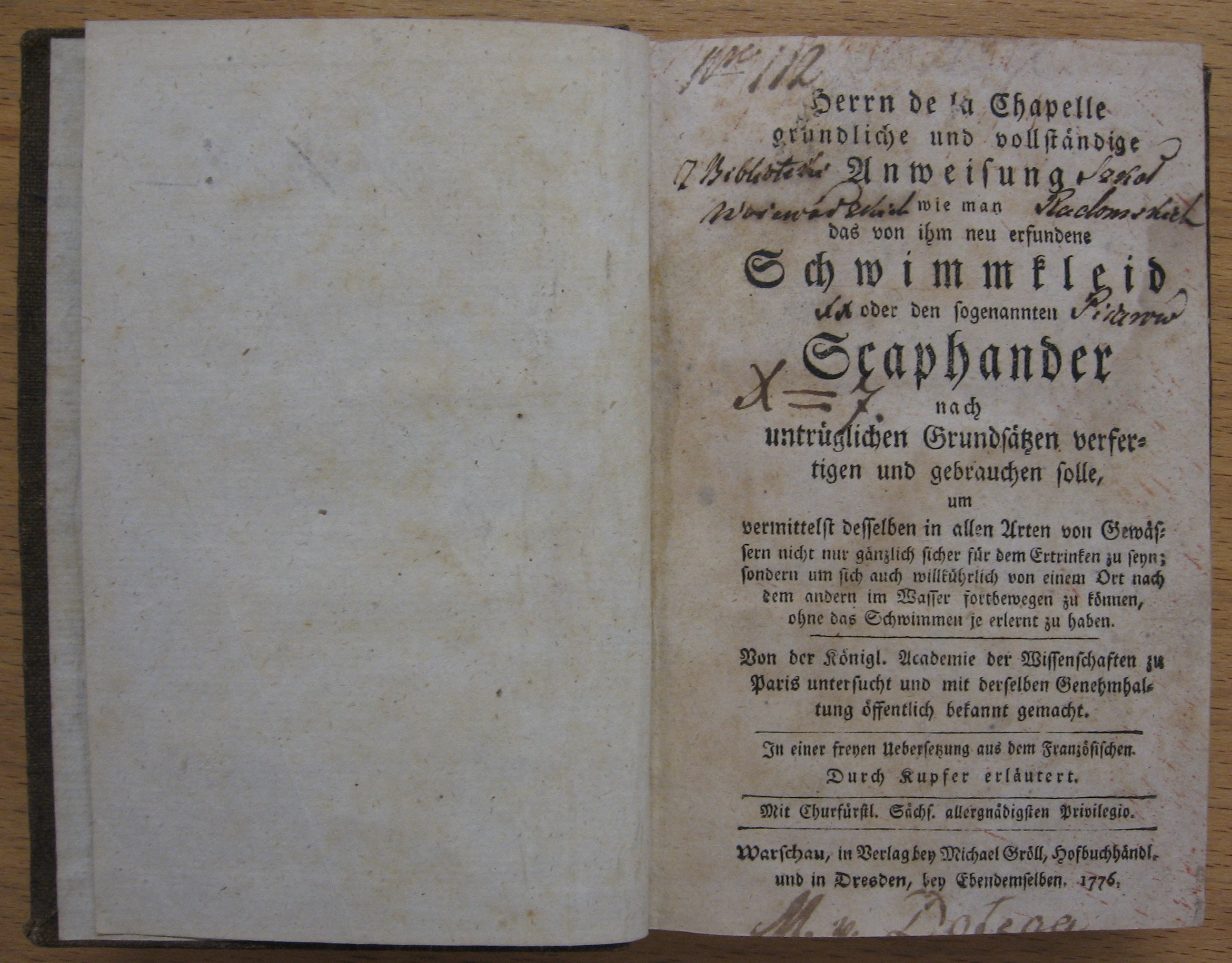
1776 German translation of the Traité de la construction du scaphandre, Varsow.

== Publications ==
- Discours sur l’Étude des Mathématiques, Paris, 1743.
- Institutions de Géométrie, enrichies de notes critiques et philosophiques sur la nature et des développements de l’esprit humain; précédées d’un Discours sur l’Étude des Mathématiques, 2 vol., Paris 1746, 1757.
- Traité des sections coniques et autres courbes anciennes, appliquées et appliquables à la pratique des differens arts, 1750.
- L’Art de communiquer ses idées, enrichi de notes historiques et philosophiques, London, 1763.
- Le Ventriloque, ou l’Engastrimythe, London & Paris, 1772 (sur Google Books).
- Traité de la Construction théorique et pratique du Scaphandre ou du bateau de l’homme, approuvé par l’Académie des Sciences (Paris 1774); réédité sous le titre Traité de la construction théorique et pratique du scaphandre ou bateau de l’homme… par M. de La Chapelle. Nouvelle édition… Précédé du Projet de formation d’une légion nautique ou d’éclaireurs des côtes, destinée à opérer tels débarquemens qu’on avisera sans le secours de vaisseaux… par… La Reynie… [Jean-Baptiste-Marie-Louis de La Reynie de La Bruyère] (Paris an XIII – 1805)

== Sources ==
- Frank Arthur Kafker, The encyclopedists as individuals: a biographical dictionary of the authors of the Encyclopédie, Oxford, Studies on Voltaire and the eighteenth Century, 1988, p. 181-4, ISBN 0-7294-0368-8.
