= Pierre Tarin =

French encyclopedist

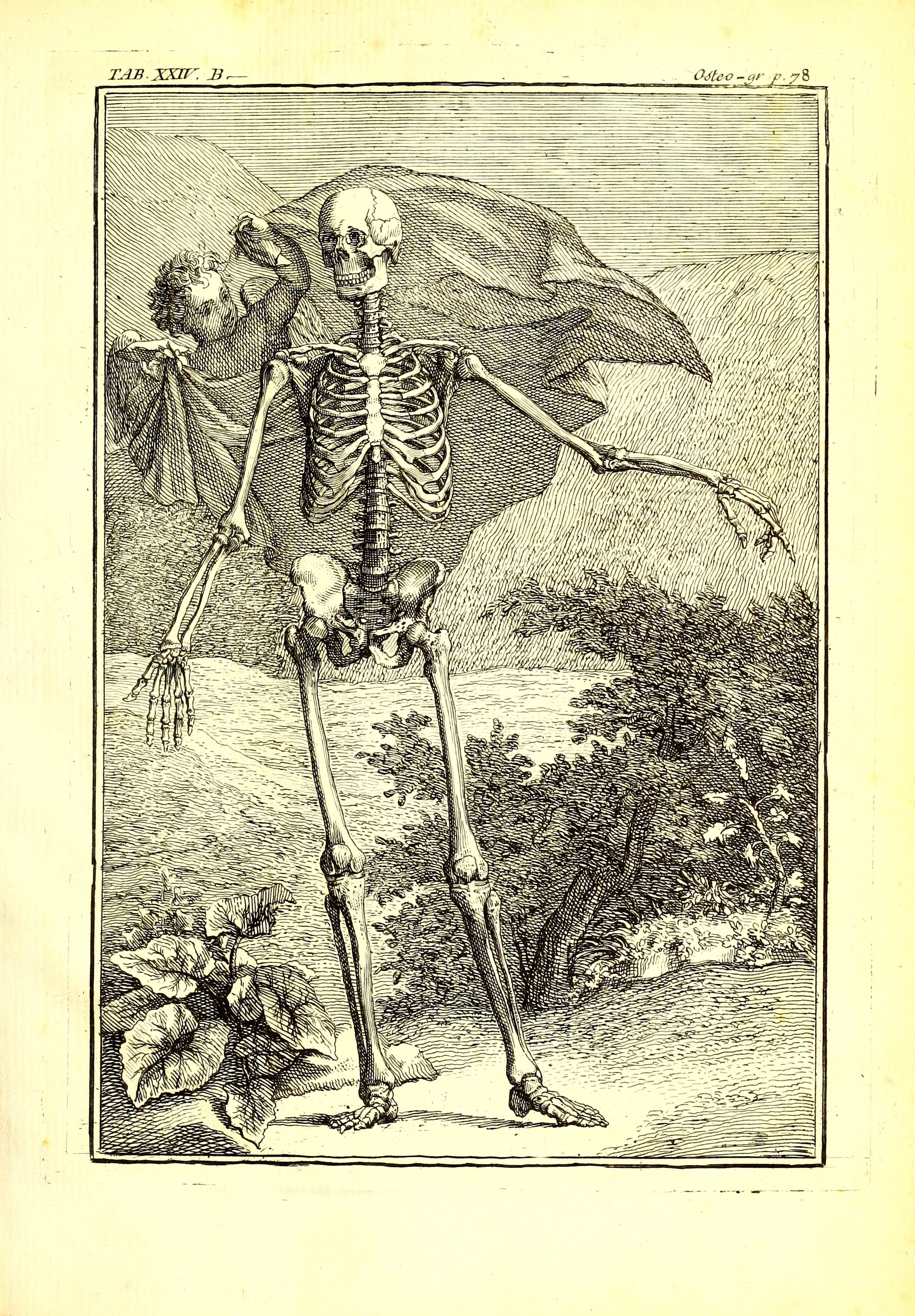
Ostéo-graphie, by Pierre Tarin.

Pierre Tarin (1725–1761) was a French doctor, writer, and translator, born in Courtenay, Orléanais. He is best known for his contributions to Encyclopédie by Diderot and D'Alembert.

Tarin was one of the primary contributors to anatomy and physiology entries in the Encyclopédie. He contributed more than 370 entries.

== Biography ==
Tarin was born in Courtenay, Loiret. He studied at the University of Paris Faculty of Medicine.

Conflicting records give his year of death as either 1761 or 1793.

== Publications ==
- Problemata anatomica, utrum inter arterias mesentericas, venasqne lacteas, immediatum datur commercium, Parisiis, 1748. in-8°.
- Anthropotomie, ou l’art de disséquer, Paris, 1750, deux vol. in-12.
- Adversaria anatomica, Parisiis, 1750, in-8°, avec figures.
- Démosgraphie, ou description des ligaments du corps humain, Paris, 1752, in-8°.
- Éléments de physiologie traduits du Latin de Haller, Paris, 1752, in-8°.
- Dictionnaire anatomique, suivi d’une Bibliothèque anatomique et physiologique, Paris, 1753, in-4°.
- Ostéographie, ou description des os de l’adulte, du fœtus, etc. Paris, 1753, in-4°.
- Myographie ou description des muscles, Paris, 1753, in-4°.
- Observations de médecine et de chirurgie, Paris, 1755, 3 vol. in-12.

== Articles in Encyclopédie ==
- "Bile", v. II, p. 249b, 218 l.
- "Teeth", v. IV, 320 l.

== See also ==
- Encyclopédistes
