= Jean-François-Henri Collot =

Jean-François-Henri Collot (English: /kɒˈloʊ/ ko-LOH, French: [ʒɑ̃ fʁɑ̃swa ɑ̃ʁi kɔlo]; Pont-d’Arches, near Charleville-Mézières 26 January 1716 – October 1804 in Mesnil, near Châlons-sur-Marne) was an 18th-century French intellectual and encyclopédiste.

Collot devoted to the cultivation of letters the leisure that allowed him the occupation of commissary of war, a position that he filled successively in Grenoble, Rennes and Nancy.

André-Joseph Collot was his brother.

== Publications ==
- Mémoire sur les invalides, in Encyclopédie by Diderot, entry « invalides ». Collot proposes to distribute in rural communities invalids yet ready to marry and make their marriage a duty in order to repopulate the countryside.
- Mémoire sur la vie parmi les troupes, écrit de façon à être lu dans un couvent de religieuses, 1769, in-8°.
- Satires en vers sur les innovations dans le ministère, Bâle, 1774, in-8°.
- L’Officier français à l’armée, opéra comique mixed with ariettes, Grenoble, 1780, in-8°.
- Épître à M. Gellée, médecin à Châlons, en vers, dans l’Annuaire du département de la Marne, année 1803.

== Sources ==
- Jean-Baptiste-Joseph Boulliot, Biographie ardennaise ou Histoire des Ardennais qui se sont fait remarquer par leurs écrits, leurs actions, leurs vertus et leurs erreurs, en 2 volumes, Paris, 1830, vol.1, p. 266-2673 .
- Ferdinand Hoefer, Nouvelle Biographie générale, t. 11, Paris, Firmin-Didot, 1856, p. 199.
