= Jacques-François de Villiers =

French physician and translator

Jacques-François de Villiers (1727–1794) was a French physician and translator.

Villiers practised as a medical doctor in the camps of the royal army during the Seven Years' War. He was later appointed docteur-régent of the faculty of medicine at the University of Paris and also worked at the Royal Veterinary School.

He wrote ten articles for Diderot and D'Alembert's famous Encyclopédie, including the longest article of the work, "Forneau (Chimie philosophique)" ("Furnace (Chemical philosophy"). He also contributed to the Journal de médecine and was the translator of numerous medical works from Latin and from English.

== Publications ==
- Méthode pour rappeler les noyés à la vie, recueillie des meilleurs auteurs (Method for resuscitating the drowned, collected from the best authors, 1771)

=== Translations from English ===
- Manuel secret et analyse des remède de MM. Sutton pour l’inoculation de la petite vérole (1774)
- La Médecine pratique de Londres, ouvrage dans lequel on a exposé la définition et les symptômes des maladies, avec la méthode actuelle de les guérir. (The London practice of physic, wherein the definition and symptoms of diseases, with the present method of cure are clearly laid down, 1778)

=== Translations from Latin ===
- Aphorismes de chirurgie by Hermann Boerhaave (7 vol., 1753-1765)
- Éléments de docimastique, ou De l’art des essais by Johann Andreas Cramer (4 vol., 1755)
- Instituts de chymie by Jacob Reinbold Spielmann (2 vol., 1770)
