= Arnulphe d'Aumont =

French doctor

- Born: 27 December 1720; Grenoble, France
- Died: 8 August 1800 (aged 79); Valence, France
- Occupations: Medicak doctor, writer
- Known for: Encyclopédie

Arnulphe d'Aumont (27 December 1720 – 8 August 1800) was a French medical doctor. His name is also spelled Daumont. He was born in Grenoble and died in Valence.

After receiving his doctorate in 1744, he became royal professor at the University of Valence in Dauphiné. In 1744 he published Relation des fêtes publiques données par l'université de Montpellier, à l'occasion du rétablissement de la santé du roi, procuré par trois médecins de cette école.

In 1762 he published Mémoire sur une nouvelle manière d'administrer le mercure dans les maladies vénériennes et autres. (Memoir on a new manner to administer mercury for venereal and other diseases) His method was to use glazed animal milk.

He wrote the article "Enfance" in the Encyclopédie.
