= Robert James (physician) =

English physician

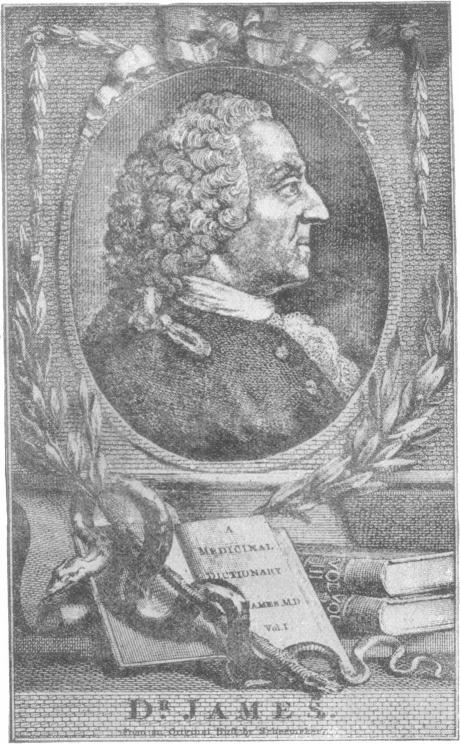
Portrait of Robert James with the three volumes of his Medicinal Dictionary

Robert James (1703 – 23 March 1776) was an English physician who is best known as the author of A Medicinal Dictionary, as the inventor of a popular "fever powder", and as a friend of Samuel Johnson.

== Life ==
James was born in 1703, at Kinvaston in Staffordshire, to Edward James, a major in the English army, and his wife Frances, a sister of Sir Robert Clarke. His early education was at Lichfield Grammar School, where he became acquainted with his fellow student Samuel Johnson. He then attended St John's College, Oxford, from which he received the degree of A.B. on 5 July 1726. He was admitted as an extra-licentiate of the Royal College of Physicians on 12 January 1727/8, and in May of the same year was created doctor of medicine at Cambridge by royal mandate. He practised at Sheffield, Lichfield, and Birmingham before moving to London, where he was admitted as a licentiate of the Royal College on 25 June 1765. He died on 23 March 1776, aged seventy-three.

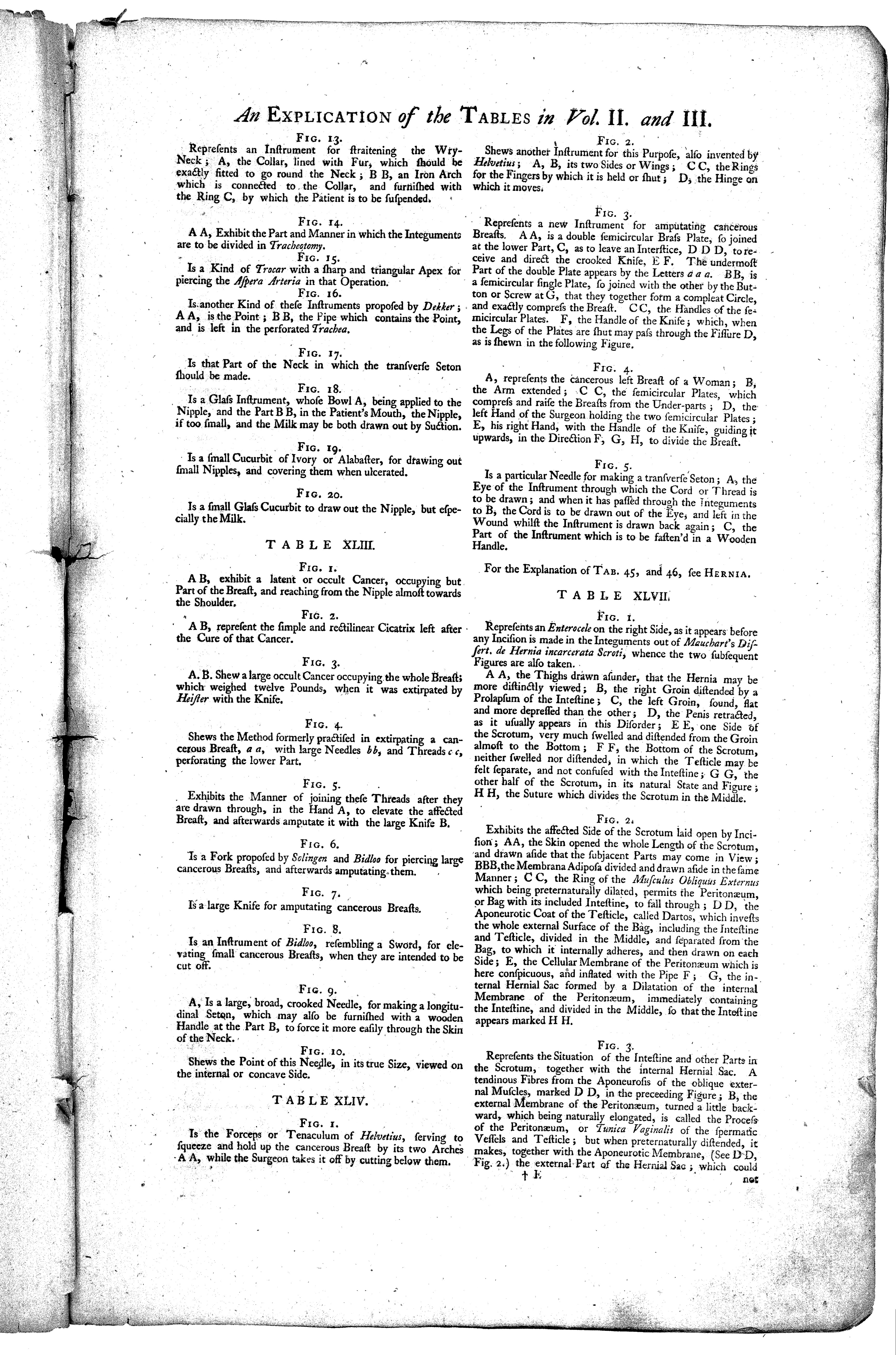
A page from James's Medicinal Dictionary

James's most notable publication was his three-volume Medicinal Dictionary (1743–1745), for which his friend Samuel Johnson wrote the "proposals", as well as several of the dictionary's articles (mainly at the beginning of the alphabet), including those for actuarius and Aretaeus. This work was immediately translated into French (as Dictionnaire universel de médecine, 1746–1748) by the team of Denis Diderot, François-Vincent Toussaint, and Marc-Antoine Eidous; and it retained its popularity for so long that Mark Twain felt justified in writing a scathing critique of it nearly 150 years later, in 1890.

== Quackery ==
His fever powder, which he patented in 1747, was one of the most successful of 18th-century patent medicines, though he is said to have "tarnished his image by patenting his powders, and falsifying their specification". (It was considered unbecomingly mercenary to patent a medicine, and his falsification of the ingredients in the patent documentation would have been designed to prevent others from replicating his formulation.) The use of this preparation, a compound of antimony and phosphate of lime, has been cited as a contributing factor in the death of Oliver Goldsmith. James' fever powder has been cited as an example of quackery.

== Selected writings ==
=== Translations ===
- Dissertation on Endemical Diseases [by Friedrich Hoffmann] and Treatise on the Diseases of Tradesmen [by Bernardino Ramazzini], 1746
- The Presages of Life and Death in Diseases [by Prospero Alpini], 1746
- Health's Improvement [by Thomas Muffet], 1746
- A Treatise on Tobacco, Tea, Coffee and Chocolate [by Simon Paulli], 1746
- The Modern Practice of Physick [by Herman Boerhaave, with annotations by Gerard van Swieten and additions from Friedrich Hoffmann], 1746

=== Original works ===
- A Medicinal Dictionary, Including Physic, Surgery, Anatomy, Chymistry, and Botany, in All Their Branches Relative to Medicine; Together with a History of Drugs, an Account of Their Various Preparations, Combinations, and Uses; and an Introductory Preface, Tracing the Progress of Physic and Explaining the Theories Which Have Principally Prevail'd in All Ages of the World, 1743–45
- A Treatise on the Gout and Rheumatism, 1745
- A Dissertation on Fevers and Inflammatory Distempers, 1748
- A Treatise on Canine Madness, 1760
- A Vindication of the Fever Powder, with a Short Treatise on the Disorders of Children, 1778

== See also ==
- History of masturbation (James's Medicinal Dictionary described masturbation as "productive of the most deplorable and generally incurable disorders".)
