= Jean-Martin de Prades =

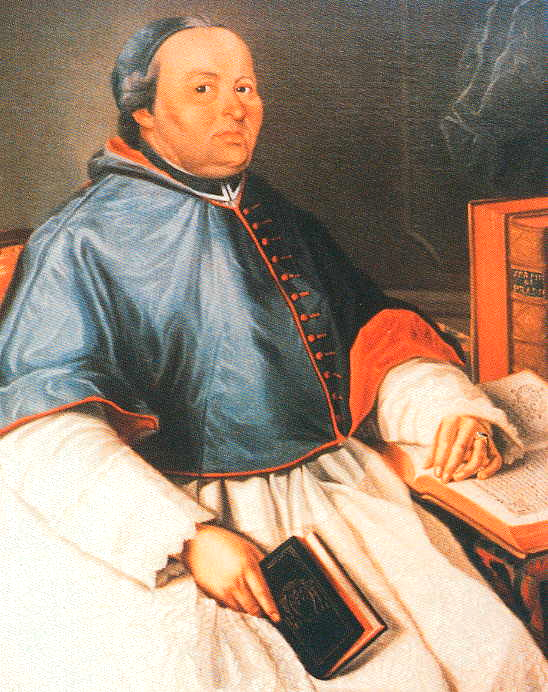
Jean-Martin de Prades

Jean-Martin de Prades (c.1720–1782) was a French Catholic theologian. He became famous through a thesis he presented that was considered irreligious.

== Life ==
Prades was born at Castelsarrasin, Tarn-et-Garonne. Having finished his preliminary studies, he went to Paris, where he lived in many seminaries, especially in that of St-Sulpice. He very soon became acquainted with the principal publishers of the Encyclopédie, and supplied them with the article on "Certitude".

About the end of 1751, he presented himself for the doctorate, driven, as a mémoire of that time says, "by the incredulous, who, in order to justify his blasphemies, wanted to have his doctrine approved by the Faculty". Prades wrote a very long thesis, which the examiners accepted without reading. The defence, which took place on 18 November, was very sharp, and scandal broke out.

On 15 December following, the Faculty declared several propositions to be "worthy of blame and censures". On 15 January following, the censure was published. According to Abbé de Prades, the soul is an unknown substance; sensations are the source of our ideas; the origin of civil law is might, from which are derived all notions of just and of unjust, of good and evil; natural law is empirical; revealed religion is only natural religion in its evolution; the chronology of the Pentateuch is false; the healings operated by Jesus Christ are doubtful miracles, since those operated by Esculapius present the same characteristics. The archbishop of Paris and several bishops approved the censure; afterwards, on the 2 March, Pope Benedict XIV condemned the thesis; at last the Parlement of Paris issued a decree against the author; further, Stanislas, Duke of Lorraine, incited the Faculty against the Abbé. Voltaire gave a detailed account of the events in his book "Le tombeau de la Sorbonne", published anonymously in 1753.

Prades found a refuge in Holland, where he published his Apology (1752). Upon the recommendation of Voltaire and of the Marquis of Argens, the Abbé became lector to Frederick of Prussia and went to Berlin. Frederick gave him a pension and two canonries, the one at Oppeln, the other at Glogau. From the year 1753, negotiations were entered upon between the Abbé de Prades and the Bishop of Breslau, Philip von Schaffgotsch, with a view to a recantation. Frederick himself induced the Abbé to return to "the bosom of the Church". Benedict XIV and Cardinal Tencin wrote the formula of recantation which was signed by the Abbé. In 1754, the Faculty of Paris again inscribed the Abbé upon the list of bachelors. The Abbé de Prades became the archdeacon of the Chapter of Glogau, and died at Glogau in 1782.

== Works ==
The Apology consists of two parts: a third part contained reflexions upon the Pastoral Letter of the bishop of Montauban and the Pastoral Instruction of the bishop of Auxerre as written by Diderot. Gabriel Brotier published the Survey of the Apology of the Abbé de Prades (1753). The question is whether the Abbé de Prades is not the author of an "Apology of the Abbé de Prades" in verse.

He also left an Abrégé de l'histoire ecclésiastique de Fleury, tr. Berne (Berlin, 1767), in two volumes. Frederick II wrote a preface to the work, which the 1913 Catholic Encyclopedia describes as "violently anti-catholic".

According to Quérard, he left in manuscript a complete translation of Tacitus, which remains unpublished. What has become of the manuscript is unknown. It is said also that he worked, before leaving France, at a Treatise on "the Truth of Religion".

== Sources ==
- Francisque Bouillier, Histoire de la philosophie cartésienne, v. 2, Paris, C. Delagrave et cie, 1868, p. 632-637.
- Ferdinand Hoefer, Nouvelle biographie générale, t. 40, Paris, Firmin-Didot, 1862, p. 963.
- Joseph-François Michaud and Louis-Gabriel Michaud, Biographie universelle ancienne et moderne : histoire par ordre alphabétique de la vie publique et privée de tous les hommes (Michaud), Paris, L.-G. Michaud, t. 36, 1823, p. 915.
- Acta. S. Facultatis Paris. circa J. M. de Prades (Paris, 1794);
- Chieland, Souvenirs de Berlin (3rd ed., IV, 368);
- Pierre Féret, La Faculté de théologie de Paris, VI (Paris, 1909), 183–193.
- Jean-François Combes-Malavialle, "Sur une ténébreuse affaire : l’Incarcération de l’abbé de Prades à Magdebourg", Dix-huitième Siècle, 1993, n° 25, p. 338-53.
- Jean-François Combes-Malavialle, "Vues nouvelles sur l’abbé de Prades", Dix-huitième Siècle, 1988, n° 20, p. 277-297.
- Jean-Claude Davis, "L’Affaire de Prades en 1751-1752 d’après deux rapports de police", Studies on Voltaire and the Eighteenth Century, 1986, n° 245, p. 359-371.
- Goyard-Fabre S., Diderot et l'affaire de l'abbé de Prades. In : Revue philosophique de la France et de l'étranger, 1984, n°3, pp. 287–309.
- Jean Haechler, "L’Article CERTITUDE de l’Encyclopédie commenté par un souscripteur anonyme", Recherches sur Diderot et sur l’Encyclopédie, 2000 Oct, n° 29, p. 129-48.
- Donald Schier, "The Abbé de Prades in Exile", Romanic Review, 1954, n° 45, p. 182-190.
- J. S. Spink, "The Clandestine Book Trade in 1752: The Publication of the Apologie de l’abbe de Prades", Studies in Eighteenth-Century French Literature, Exeter, Univ. of Exeter, 1975, p. 243-56.
- J. S. Spink, "The Abbe de Prades and the Encyclopaedists: Was There a Plot?", French Studies, 1970, n° 24, p. 225-36.
- J. S. Spink, "Un abbé philosophe : l’affaire de J.-M. de Prades", Dix-huitième Siècle, 1971, n° 3, p. 145-80.
- Voltaire, "Le tombeau de la Sorbonne ", 1753.

Attribution
