= Louis de Jaucourt =

French scholar (1704-1779)

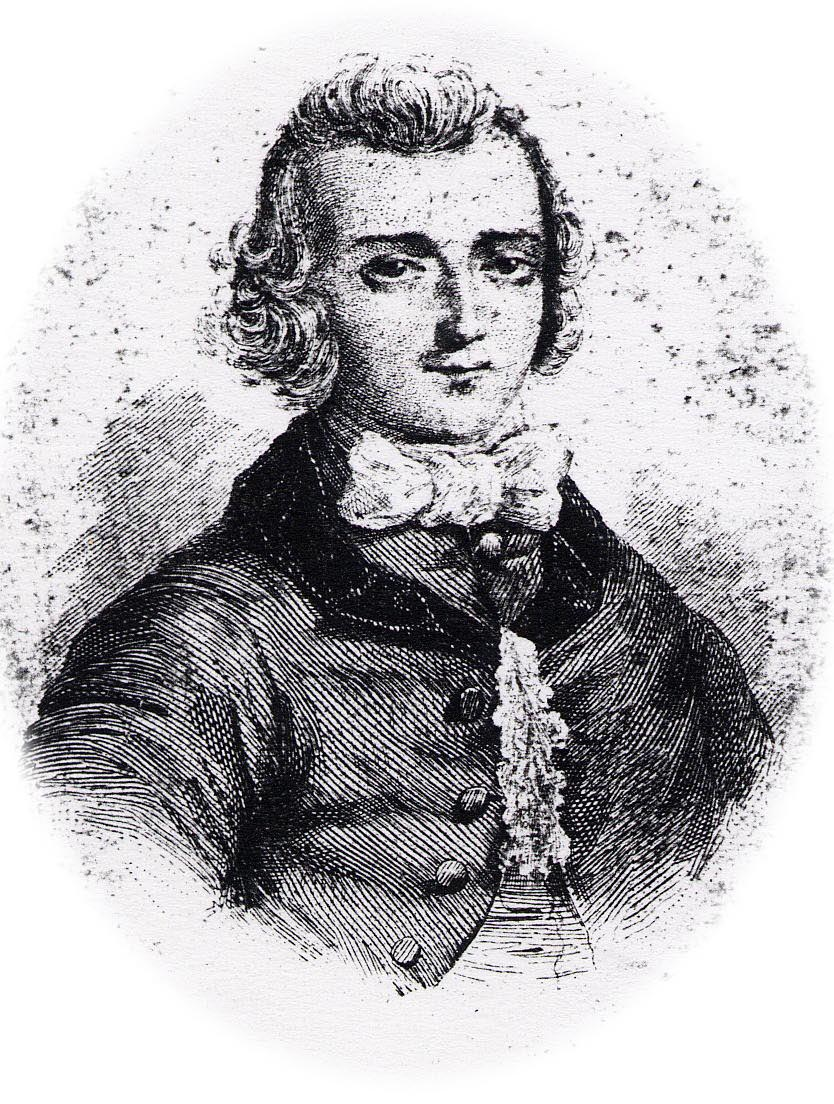
- Born: 16 September 1704; Paris, France
- Died: 3 February 1779 (aged 74); Compiègne, France
- Occupations: Physician, philosophe, writer
- Known for: Encyclopédie

Chevalier Louis de Jaucourt (French: [də ʒokuʁ]; 16 September 1704 – 3 February 1779) was a French scholar and the most prolific contributor to the Encyclopédie. Writing some 17,000 articles pro bono, his contributions amounted to around 25% of the entire work. His subjects included physiology, chemistry, botany, pathology, and political history.

Following the French Revolution, Jaucourt's legacy was largely overshadowed by those of Denis Diderot, Jean-Jacques Rousseau and others. This was mainly because of his aristocratic background. By the mid-20th century, however, his work was receiving more scholarly attention.

== Biography ==
Jaucourt was born in Paris, the youngest son of an aristocratic family. The Jaucourt family belonged to the Burgundian peasant nobility and had become Huguenots, and was therefore regarded with suspicion by the powers of Catholic France. As he could not entirely rely on inheritance or status to support himself, Jaucourt became a scholar. He studied theology in Geneva, natural sciences at the University of Cambridge, and medicine in Leiden. Upon returning to France, he spent the next 20 years writing the Lexicon medicum universale, a six-volume work on anatomy. He sent it to be published in Amsterdam to avoid French censorship but the ship carrying the sole manuscript sank, and 20 years of labour were lost. He also wrote a biography of Leibniz.

He practiced medicine and was a Fellow of the Royal Society in London and a member of the academies of Berlin, Stockholm (elected a foreign member of the Royal Swedish Academy in 1756), and Bordeaux.

== The Encyclopédie ==
Jaucourt volunteered to work on the Encyclopédie, recruited by publisher Michel-Antoine David starting with the second volume of the work. He began modestly, with only a few articles in each of the next several volumes, but gradually became more and more involved. Between 1759 and 1765 he wrote on average 8 encyclopedia articles per day, for a total of 17,266 out of 71,818 articles (or about 25%), making him by far the single most prolific contributor to Encyclopédie. His contributions come to some 4,700,000 words. He was especially active in the later volumes, writing between 30% and 45% of the articles in volumes 10 to 17. This earned him the nickname l'esclave de l'Encyclopédie (the slave of the Encyclopedia).

By the publication of the eighth volume, Diderot saw fit to thank his collaborator for his tireless dedication to the project, stating:

"If we have raised a shout of joy like the sailor when he espies land after a sombre night that has kept him midway between sky and flood, it is to M. de Jaucourt that we are indebted for it. What has he not done for us, especially in these latter times? With what constancy has he not refused all the solicitations, whether of friendship or of authority, that sought to take him away from us? Never has sacrifice of repose, of health, of interest been more absolute and more entire."

Unlike other editors, Jaucourt was independently wealthy and asked for no payment for his full-time labours. He employed a group of secretaries, out of his own pocket, to help with the effort and to take his dictation. Most of his works consisted of summarising full books and other longer works into encyclopaedia articles, with much content copied verbatim from existing sources, earning him the derision of some contributors that favored more original thought.

Jaucourt did not consistently create original articles expressing his own opinions and views of his subjects, but rather implicitly showed his personal beliefs through the careful cultivation of certain passages, emphasis and reiteration, and even word choice. The authors he selected also show how he chose which messages to disseminate under the broader context of each article. For example, in his article on "Government" Jaucourt draws nearly verbatim from the writings of John Locke. Given the politically incendiary tone of the works Jaucourt copied and paraphrased from, he concealed the names and publication information of much of his source material. Often to avoid censure, the writer would misattribute quotations, such as when he borrowed a fellow philosophe's quote decrying tyranny and attributed it to Tacitus.

He wrote mainly on the sciences, especially medicine and biology. He took a firmly mechanist approach to the subject. This is in sharp contrast to the other major contributor in this area, Ménuret de Chambaud, who had a firmly vitalist view.

While his main focus was on science and biology, he also covered a wide array of other subjects. It is in his works on history and society that his political and philosophical views become clearly evident. He wrote articles of central importance on war, monarchy, people, and Muhammad. His writing is never as openly political as other contributors such as Diderot and Voltaire, but it is clear that he possessed deeply held views. Some of his works, such as those on historical subjects clearly contain radical and anti-clerical messages through implied comparisons between the ancient past and modern France, such as in his article "Paris". Presenting criticisms through these parallels allowed Jaucourt to both bypass the censors that plagued most contributors to the Encyclopédie and to allow his commentaries on society in a less overt but still impactful way. Jaucourt also criticized Divination and superstition, following Francis Bacon in interpreting superstition primarily as an intellectual error. He also wrote important pieces on slavery, the slave trade, and black people, all strongly condemning slavery as counter to both natural rights and liberties.

Alastair Davidson has stated that though not regarded today as one of the foremost contributors to Enlightenment theory or political thought, Jaucourt's writings demonstrate great dedication to many Enlightenment principles. As he delineates in his article "Traite des nègres," he believed that the commodification of human life is abhorrent and that every person has the fundamental right of freedom. He also rejected superstition and held that while superstition should be cast aside, even superstitions were preferable to beliefs instilled by coercion or force.

He died, aged 74, in Compiègne.

== Sources ==
- Philip Blom, Enlightening the World: Encyclopédie, The Book That Changed the Course of History, London, Palgrave Macmillan, 2005.
- Luigi Delia, "Crime et châtiment dans l'Encyclopédie. Les enjeux de l'interprétation de Montesquieu par de Jaucourt", in "Dix-huitième siècle", n. 41, 2009, pp. 469–486.
- James Doolittle, "Jaucourt's Use of Source Material in the Encyclopédie", Modern Language Notes. Vol. 65, No. 6. The Johns Hopkins University Press, June 1950.
- Frank A. Kafker, "The Recruitment of the Encyclopedists", Eighteenth-Century Studies Vol. 6, No. 4. The Johns Hopkins University Press, Summer, 1973.
- Werner Raupp: Jaucourt, Louis, Chevalier, in: Biographisch-Bibliographisches Kirchenlexikon (BBKL), Vol. 36. Bautz: Nordhausen 2015, (ISBN 978-3-88309-920-0), cols. 650–657 (with detailed bibliography).
- Richard N. Schwab, "The Extent of the Chevalier de Joucourt's Contribution to Diderot's Encyclopédie", Modern Language Notes. Vol. 72, No. 7. The Johns Hopkins University Press, Nov. 1957.
