= Encyclopédie =

General encyclopedia published in France from 1751 to 1772

Encyclopédie, ou dictionnaire raisonné des sciences, des arts et des métiers
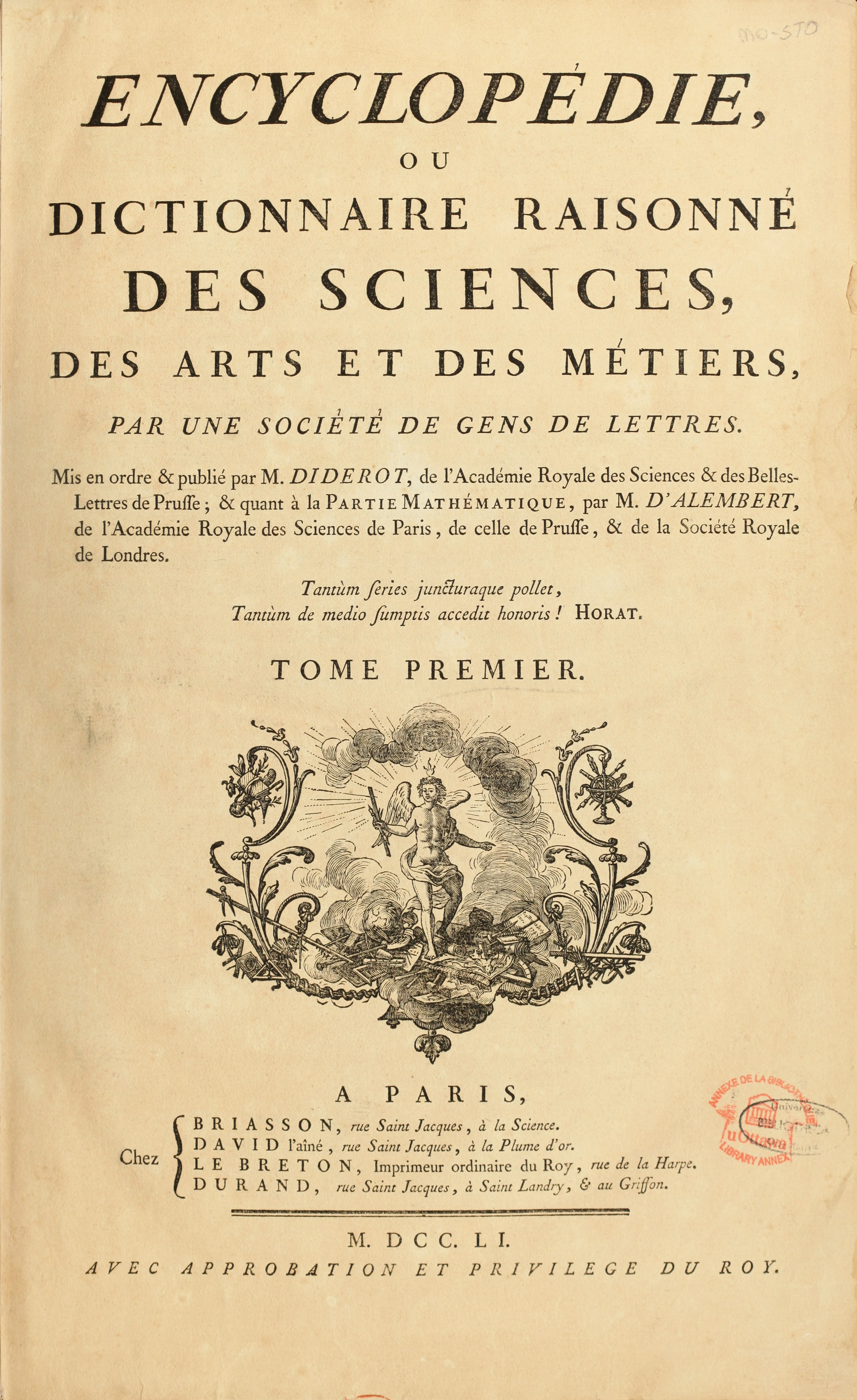
- Title page
- Author: Numerous contributors (edited by Denis Diderot and Jean le Rond d'Alembert)
- Language: Classical French
- Subject: General
- Genre: Reference encyclopedia
- Publisher: André le Breton, Michel-Antoine David, Laurent Durand and Antoine-Claude Briasson
- Publication date: 1751–1772
- Publication place: France
- Original text: Encyclopédie, ou dictionnaire raisonné des sciences, des arts et des métiers at French Wikisource

The Encyclopédie, ou dictionnaire raisonné des sciences, des arts et des métiers (French for 'Encyclopedia, or a Systematic Dictionary of the Sciences, Arts and Crafts'), better known as the Encyclopédie (French: [ɑ̃siklɔpedi]), was a general encyclopedia published in France between 1751 and 1772, with later supplements, revised editions, an index, and translations. It had many contributors, known among contemporaries as the Encyclopédistes. It was edited by Denis Diderot and, until 1759, co-edited by Jean le Rond d'Alembert.

The Encyclopédie is most famous for representing the thought of the Enlightenment. According to Diderot in the article "Encyclopédie", the Encyclopédie's aim was "to change the way people think" and to allow people to inform themselves. Diderot hoped the Encyclopédie would disseminate a vast amount of knowledge to the present and future generations. Thus, it is an example of democratization of knowledge, though the high price of the first edition especially (980 livres) prevented it from being bought by much of the middle class.

The Encyclopédie was also the first encyclopedia to include contributions from many named contributors, and it was the first general encyclopedia to describe the mechanical arts in much detail. In the first edition, seventeen folio volumes of text were accompanied by eleven volumes of engravings. Later editions were published in smaller formats and with fewer engravings in order to reach a wider audience within Europe.

== Origins ==
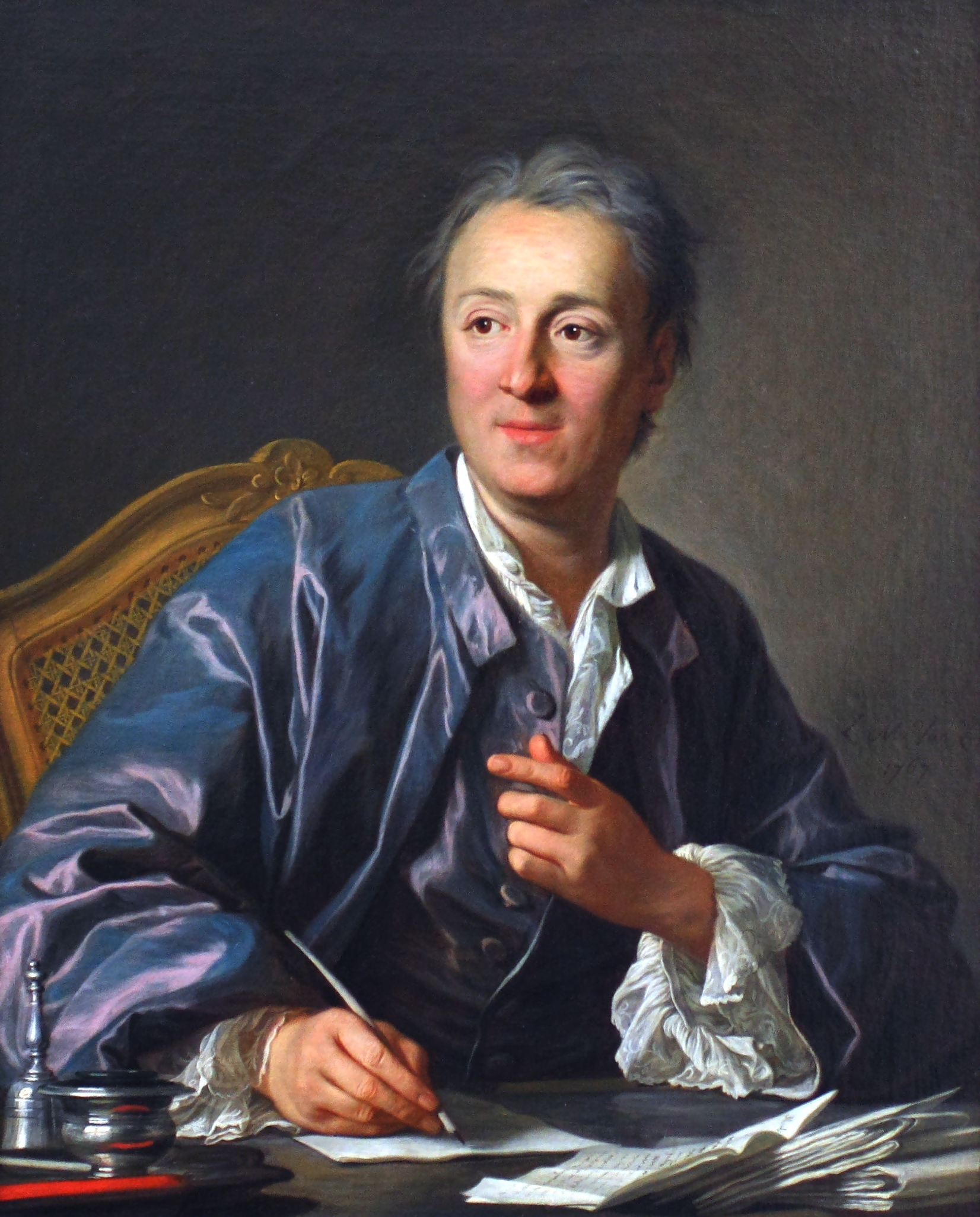
Denis Diderot

The Encyclopédie was originally conceived as a French translation of Ephraim Chambers's Cyclopaedia (1728). Chambers had first published his Cyclopaedia, or an Universal Dictionary of Arts and Sciences in two volumes in London in 1728, following in the lineage of a handful of other dictionaries of the arts and sciences published in Europe since the late seventeenth century. This work became renowned, and four editions were published between 1738 and 1742. An Italian translation appeared between 1747 and 1754. In France, a member of the banking family Lambert had started translating the Cyclopaedia into French, but it was a translation of the Cyclopaedia undertaken around 1745 by the expatriate Englishman John Mills and the German Gottfried Sellius that attracted the interest of the Parisian bookseller and printer André Le Breton and led to the publication of the Encyclopédie.

Early in 1745 a prospectus for the Encyclopédie was published to attract subscribers to the project. Here, for the first time, the encyclopedia was entitled the Encyclopédie, a variant on the title chosen by Chambers. The four-page prospectus included a schedule stating that the work would be published in five volumes from June 1746 through the end of 1748.

The prospectus was reviewed positively and cited at some length in several journals. The Jesuit-run Mémoires pour l'histoire des sciences et des beaux arts was lavish in its praise. In June 1745, the Mercure printed a twenty-five-page article that praised Mills as a translator, equally fluent in French and English. The Mercure also reported that Mills had recruited several scholars to help, had devoted his fortune to supporting the enterprise, and was the sole owner of the publishing privilege. In fact, Mills' supposed fortune was probably fictional.

In any event, cooperation between Le Breton and Mills fell apart later on in 1745. Le Breton claimed among other things that Mills's knowledge of French was inadequate, an accusation supported by one contemporary. In a confrontation with the sword-wielding Englishman, Le Breton assaulted Mills with his cane. Mills took Le Breton to court, but the court decided in Le Breton's favor. Mills returned to England soon afterward. For his new editor, Le Breton settled on the mathematician Jean Paul de Gua de Malves. Among those hired by Gua de Malves were the young philosopher Étienne Bonnot de Condillac, the mathematician Jean le Rond d'Alembert, and Denis Diderot. Thirteen months later, in August 1747, Gua de Malves resigned under pressure from Le Breton, having proven an ineffective leader. Le Breton then formed an alliance with three other booksellers (Antoine Briasson, Laurent Durand, and Michel-Antoine David) and hired Diderot and D'Alembert to be the new editors. D'Alembert left the role in 1758, but Diderot remained editor for the next 25 years, seeing the Encyclopédie through to its completion, though he threatened to resign upon discovering in 1764 that Le Breton, fearful of a crackdown, had been censoring some of his contributions to the Encyclopédie behind his back.

== Publication ==
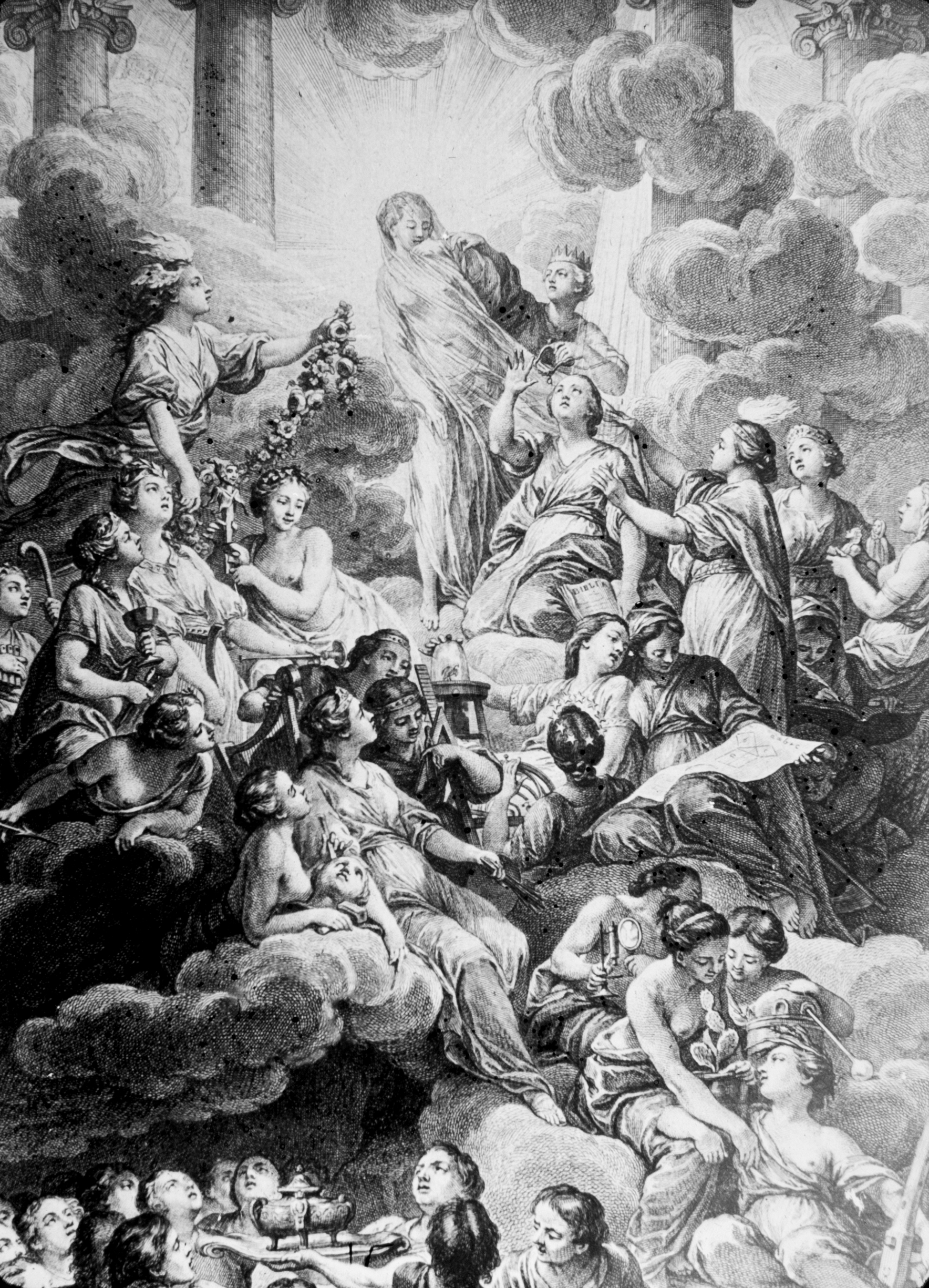
Extract from the frontispiece of the Encyclopédie (1772). It was drawn by Charles-Nicolas Cochin and engraved by Bonaventure-Louis Prévost. The work is laden with symbolism: The figure in the center represents Truth, surrounded by bright light (the central symbol of the Enlightenment). Two other figures on the right, Reason and Philosophy, are tearing the veil from Truth.

The work consisted of 28 volumes, with approximately 71,818 articles and 2,784 plates of illustrations (the exact numbers depend on one's definition of an "article" and a "plate"). The first seventeen volumes were published between 1751 and 1765; eleven volumes of plates were finished by 1772. The first edition had a pressrun of 4,225 copies, well above the average pressrun for French books at the time, which was around 2000 copies., and it earned the four publishers profits of more than two million livres. Because of its sometimes radical contents, the Encyclopédie stirred up controversy in conservative circles, and after the publication of the second volume, it was briefly suspended by a royal edict of 1752 accusing it of "destroying royal authority, fomenting a spirit of independence and revolt, and ... laying the groundwork for error, for the corruption of morals, and for irreligion and atheism".

In 1759, following the publication of the seventh volume, on the initiative of the Parlement of Paris, the French government suspended the encyclopedia's privilege. Nevertheless, work continued "in secret", partially because the project had highly placed supporters, including the minister Malesherbes and the royal mistress Madame de Pompadour. French authorities deliberately ignored the continuation of the work, thinking the official ban was sufficient to appease the church and other enemies of the project.

During this period, Diderot and the publishers changed and apparently falsified the encyclopedia's imprint. The title pages of volumes 1 through 7, published between 1751 and 1757, claimed Paris as the place of publication. However, the title pages of volumes 8 through 17, published together in 1765, show Neufchastel as the place of publication. Neuchâtel was safely across the French border in what is now part of Switzerland but which was then an independent principality, where production of the Encyclopédie would have been secure from interference by the French state. Meanwhile, the actual production of volumes 8 through 17 quietly continued, presumably in Paris, but perhaps somewhere else. To minimize publicity, the French government seems to have stipulated that the final volumes be released at the same time. The volumes were apparently finished in the summer of 1765, allowing delivery to begin by the end of the year.

The Encyclopédie also appeared in other formats and editions. Two were published (in French) in the Italian cities of Lucca and Leghorn. Two others were published in the smaller formats of quarto and octavo, which allowed the price of the set to be brought within range of the upper middle class. While too original to count as a re-edition, the so-called Yverdon Encyclopédie (1770–80), published in the Swiss town of Yverdon, was inspired by and borrowed extensively from the Encyclopédie.

In 1775, the publisher Charles Joseph Panckoucke obtained the rights to the work. He issued five volumes of supplementary material and a two-volume index from 1776 to 1780. Some scholars include these seven "extra" volumes as part of the first full issue of the Encyclopédie, for a total of 35 volumes, although they were not written or edited by the original authors.

From 1782 to 1832, Panckoucke and his successors published a greatly expanded edition of the work in some 166 volumes as the Encyclopédie méthodique. This enormous work, organized in thematic sub-series, occupied a thousand workers in production and 2,250 contributors.

== Contributors ==
Since the objective of the editors of the Encyclopédie was to gather knowledge from myriad specialties, Diderot and D'Alembert knew they would need various contributors to help them with their project. In the end, more than 140 people contributed at least one article. (For a detailed list, see Encyclopédistes.) Many of the philosophes (intellectuals of the French Enlightenment) contributed to the Encyclopédie, including Diderot himself, Voltaire, Rousseau, and Montesquieu. The most prolific contributor was Louis de Jaucourt, who wrote 17,266 articles between 1759 and 1765, or about eight per day, representing a full 25% of the Encyclopédie. Especially after D'Alembert's resignation as co-editor, Jaucourt became a sort of unofficial second editor.

The publication of the Encyclopédie created opportunities for contributors to share their ideas and interests. In particular, social gatherings at the Parisian home of d'Holbach brought together a minority of contributors on a regular basis. Still, as Frank Kafker has argued, the contributors were not a unified group:

From almost the beginning of the publication of volume i in June 1751, many contemporaries took to calling the collaborators by the term "Encyclopedists" and assumed that they were a cohesive group of religious and political reformers in close-knit association.... But, as we shall see, the Encyclopedists were not a company of obedient soldiers led by a few generals in a campaign to destroy the Old Regime. They were instead a varied collection of men of letters, physicians, scientists, craftsmen, scholars, and others, each frequently following his own bent with little central direction. The Encyclopédie became not a party statement, but a great compendium of knowledge filled with contradictions, a mélange of ideas, some progressive and some conservative.

The Encyclopédie was the first encyclopedia to credit contributors within articles in a systematic way. This it accomplished for regular contributors by appending symbols (sometimes called "signatures") at the ends of articles. An "O" at the end of an article indicated D'Alembert as responsible, for example, just as an "L" did the anatomist Pierre Tarin. The symbols were set forth in the "Preliminary Discourse to the Encyclopedia of Diderot". From the beginning, however, some articles were anonymous, whether because of oversight or because no one dared to claim credit. The number of anonymous articles increased after 1759.

Many of the most prolific contributors to the Encyclopédie were compensated for their work. At least twenty-nine of the thirty-eight contributors whose articles were identified by a symbol were paid by the publishers, and their pay constituted a significant share of their total income. From 1746 to 1767, Diderot received about 2,800 livres per year for his work as an editor and an author. By contrast, Jaucourt, a wealthy nobleman, seems to have offered his services to the publishers for next to nothing. Irregular contributors, for their part, were almost never paid for their articles.

Some contributors to the Encyclopédie were volunteers, but most were recruited, whether by one of the co-editors, another contributor, or someone else. Contributors were generally recruited on the basis of their knowledge in a particular domain, which they were expected to contribute on. Claude Bourgelat, the author of two books on horses, thus wrote on manège and farriery; Louis-Jean-Marie Daubenton, a naturalist and member of the Académie Royale des Sciences, wrote on natural history; and Le Breton, the publisher, wrote on printer's ink. Still, specialties were not as narrowly defined as they would be for later encyclopedias. Notice, for example, the range of topics on which the following contributors wrote:

- D'Alembert – science (especially mathematics and physics), contemporary affairs, philosophy, religion
- Diderot – natural history, language, economics, mechanical arts, philosophy, politics, religion
- d'Holbach – chemistry, mineralogy, politics, religion
- Jaucourt – economics, literature, medicine, natural history, politics, geography
- Rousseau – music, political theory
- Anne Robert Jacques Turgot, Baron de Laune – economics, etymology, philosophy, physics
- Voltaire – history, literature, philosophy

== Compilation and sources ==
Like other dictionaries and encyclopedias, the Encyclopédie was more compiled than written from scratch. Especially since the large-scale digitization of historical texts in the late twentieth century, scholars have paid increasing attention to the ways in which contributors copied, paraphrased, pieced together, and (more generally) used other texts to make their own articles.

Many alphabetical works, specialized and general, served as sources for the Encyclopédie, but the two most important were probably the Cyclopaedia and France's venerable Jesuit encyclopedia, the Dictionnaire universal françois-latin (1704, nicknamed the Dictionnaire de Trévoux). Numerous articles translated from the Cyclopaedia ended up being published in the Encyclopédie with little change, a fact Diderot later regretted. Likewise, as Marie Leca-Tsiomis has shown, the Dictionnaire de Trévoux was a source for (and foil for) the Encyclopédie. In a sample of articles from "Io" to "Jouissance", for example, she found nine articles involving unsubtle copying. Beyond simple copying, consider Diderot's article "Aguaxima":

AGUAXIMA, (Nat. hist. bot.), a plant from Brazil and the islands of South America. This is all we are told about it; and I would like to know for whom such descriptions are made. It cannot be for the natives of the countries concerned, who are likely to know more about the aguaxima than is contained in this description [….] It is not meant for us either, for what do we care that there is a tree in Brazil named aguaxima, if all we know about it is its name? What is the point of giving the name? It leaves the ignorant just as they were and teaches the rest of us nothing. If I nonetheless mention this plant here, along with several others that are described just as poorly, then it is out of consideration for certain readers who prefer to find nothing in a dictionary article or even to find something silly, than to find no article at all.

To understand Diderot's frustration and irony here, it helps to know that he was reacting to an article of the same name in the Dictionnaire de Trévoux:

AGUAXIMA. A term in botany. This is a plant found in Brazil and in the islands of South America. See QUEUE DE LEZARD. It is a species of this.

Non-alphabetical sources as well were frequently copied or paraphrased into the Encyclopédie, verbatim or paraphrased, often with little or no acknowledgment, among them Johann Jakob Brucker's Historia critica philosophiae and George-Louis Leclerc de Buffon's Histoire naturelle.

== Contents and controversies ==
=== Structure ===
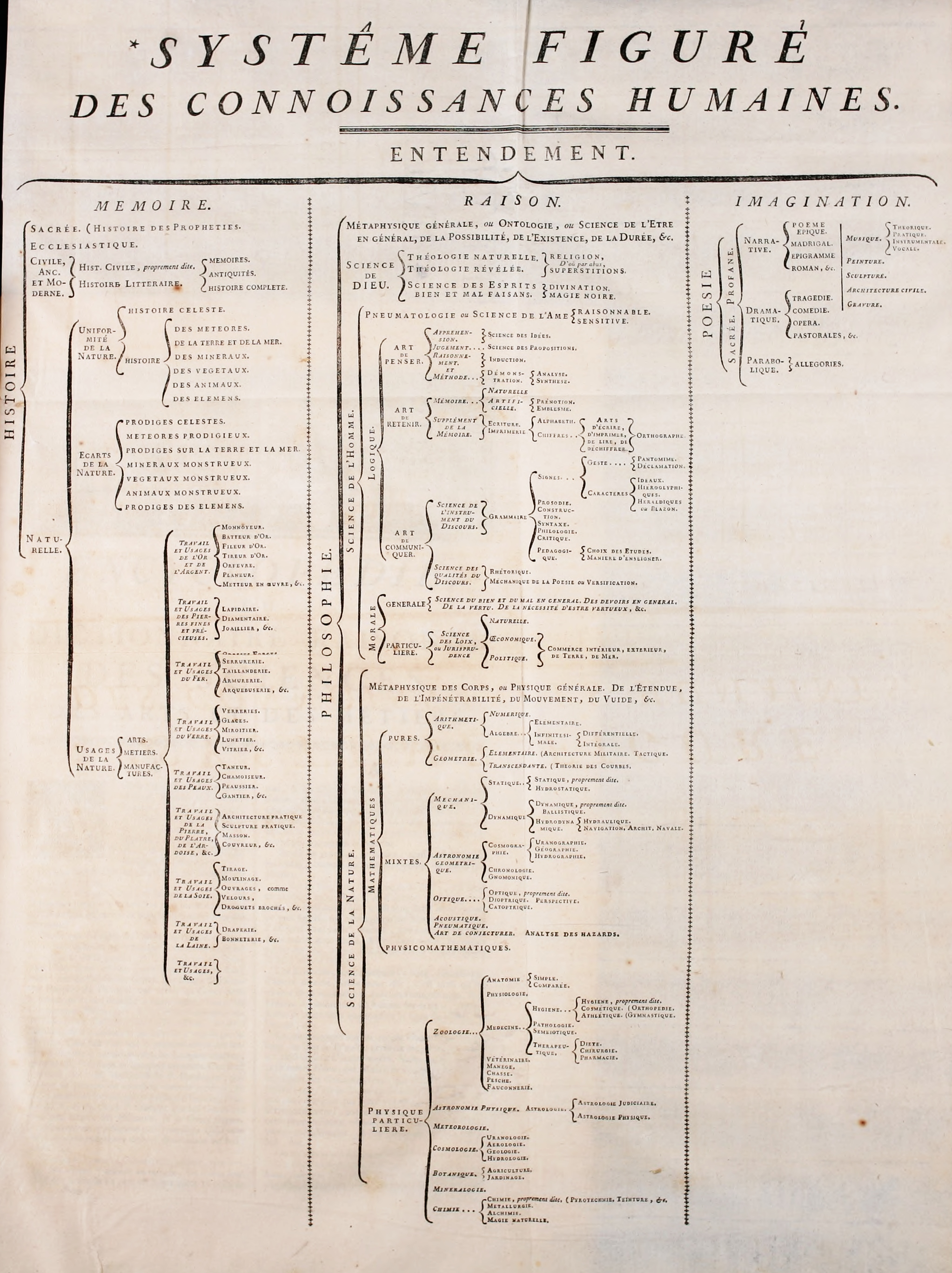
Fig. 3: "Figurative system of human knowledge", the structure that the Encyclopédie organized knowledge into. It had three main branches: memory, reason, and imagination.

The introduction to the Encyclopédie, D'Alembert's "Preliminary Discourse", is considered an important exposition of Enlightenment ideals. Among other things, it presents a taxonomy of human knowledge (see Fig. 3). The idea of presenting a taxonomy of knowledge in the introduction to an alphabetical encyclopedia arose with the Cyclopaedia. More specific inspiration for the one in the Encyclopédie came from Francis Bacon's The Advancement of Learning. The three main branches of knowledge were: "Memory"/History, "Reason"/Philosophy, and "Imagination"/Poetry. In this taxonomy and elsewhere, D'Alembert's "Preliminary Discourse" made human reason, and not religious or other authority, the measure of knowledge.

According to the "Preliminary Discourse", the purpose of the tree of knowledge was to allow users of the Encyclopédie to relate articles they consulted to the entirety of knowledge. Accordingly, the first article in the Encyclopédie, on the letter "A", began, following the headword, with a parenthetical indication of its place in the tree of knowledge. Notice the abbreviations in italics, which correspond to levels in the tree of knowledge:

A, a & a s.m. (ordre Encyclopéd. Entend. Science de l'homme, Logique, Art de communiquer, Gramm.) caractere ou figure de la premiere lettre de l'Alphabet, en latin, en françois, & en presque toutes les Langues de l'Europe.

Such indications are often called rubrics in English ("désignants" in French). They had already been used in previous encyclopedias, but the Cyclopaedia was the first to relate them to an introductory overview of knowledge. In theory, rubrics in the Encyclopédie were supposed to match keywords in the tree of knowledge, but the correspondence was already breaking down in the opening pages of volume 1. Some articles had no rubrics. More seriously, new rubrics were invented that had nothing to do with the tree of knowledge, and neither co-editor did much to impose any standardization. As the volumes progressed, the tree of knowledge seems to have faded from the awareness of Diderot and the other contributors. Tellingly, when D'Alembert reprinted materials from the Encyclopédie in his Mélanges, he left out the tree of knowledge. Nor, when proposing ideas for an encyclopedia later in life, did Diderot suggest including a tree of knowledge.

However disillusioned the co-editors may have been with their tree of knowledge, the idea became somewhat fashionable after the time of the Encyclopédie before largely disappearing from the world of encyclopedias in the mid-nineteenth century.

One much-discussed structural feature of the Encyclopédie is the cross-reference, a kind of precursor to the hyper-link. Cross-references had long been familiar to scholars, and they had been used in dictionaries and encyclopedias well before the time of the Encyclopédie. The Cyclopaedia was the first encyclopedia to use a large number of cross-references in a systematic way. Chambers' general goal was to counter the fragmenting effects of alphabetical order by establishing links. Having begun its existence as an expanded translation, the Encyclopédie inherited its favor for cross-references from the Cyclopaedia. At times, it even inherited the specific cross-references used in the Cyclopaedia in the midst of translated articles. Unlike the Cyclopaedia, however, the Encyclopédie was written by numerous collaborators, all of whom had their own ideas about how to use cross-references. The editors seem to have done little to impose uniformity.

In the article "Encyclopédie", Diderot reviewed his work on the Encyclopédie and mused about the role of cross-references in an encyclopedia. Among other things, he noted the possibility of using satirical cross-references to subvert authority, though he cautioned against using them frequently and did not suggest that the Encyclopédie contained any such cross-references. Still, since at least 1759, people have claimed that the Encyclopédie featured a "system" of such cross-references. One of the examples most commonly cited can be found at the end of the article "Cannibals" (in French, "Anthropophages"):

The pagans accused the first Christians of cannibalism; they permitted, it was said, the crime of Oedipus, and they renewed the scene of Thyestes. It seems, from Tatian's works, from the eighth chapter of Tertullian's apology for the Christians, and from Salvian's fourth book of Providence, that it was the secret celebration of our mysteries that gave rise to these calumnies. They kill a child, the pagans added, and eat its flesh; accusations that were based only on vague notions of the Eucharist and the communion which they had drawn from the words of the poorly educated. See EUCHARIST, COMMUNION, ALTAR, &c. (G)

Yet, as Marie Leca-Tsiomis has pointed out, the very same article, with the same cross-references, had already appeared in English in the Cyclopaedia, an encyclopedia never considered a hotbed of subversive cross-references. Furthermore, as the "G" at the end of the article shows, the translation from the Cyclopaedia was signed (and thus apparently approved) by Mallet, an orthodox clergyman. If he had considered the article disrespectful toward Christianity, he would surely have reacted when the article was published. More generally, Leca-Tsiomis concludes, there is simply no evidence of a system of ironic cross-references in the Encyclopédie.

Entries in the Encyclopédie were of widely varying lengths, some just a line long, others extending to dozens of pages. Some of the longest can be found under "Fourneau" (88 columns on chemists' furnaces), "Verrerie" (80 columns on glass-making), "Venerie" (73 columns on hunting), "Soie" (71 columns on silk-making), and "Parlement" (70 columns on the Parlement of Paris). Here, once again, we see the emphasis the Encyclopédie placed on the mechanical arts.

=== Overall scope ===
The Encyclopédie was narrower in scope than nineteenth- and twentieth-century encyclopedias (which covered history lavishly), and much narrower in scope than Wikipedia (which also covers popular culture lavishly). Like the Cyclopaedia, its model, it was a dictionary of the arts and sciences – or, rather, to quote its subtitle, a dictionary of the sciences, arts, and crafts. In contemporary parlance, dictionaries of the arts and sciences were often contrasted with historical dictionaries, the former concentrating on areas of knowledge that could be understood as rational systems, the latter concentrating on contingent facts. Dictionaries of the arts and sciences had been encroaching on historical knowledge since their beginnings in the late seventeenth century, and the process continued with the Encyclopédie, which covered geography more thoroughly than the Cyclopaedia or any previous dictionary of the arts and sciences. It covered history only patchily, however, and the omission reflected not simply an oversight but a conviction that historical knowledge belonged in a different kind of work.

In the article 'Encyclopédie', Diderot wrote that "the purpose of an encyclopedia is to bring together knowledge scattered across the surface of the earth."

At the beginning of the work, neither Diderot nor D'Alembert planned for biographical articles, thinking them extraneous to a dictionary of the arts and sciences. The omission was apparently criticized, for the editors defended their position in volume 3. Soon afterward, declaring independence, it would seem, from a policy he disagreed with, Jaucourt began introducing biographies of individuals in geographical articles in volume 6. Normally he placed the biographies in articles on the subjects' places of birth, though at times he used places where they had flourished or died. Such biographies proliferated and came to dominate many geographical articles. The articles on the towns of Pau, Stratford, and Wolstrope, for example, were devoted almost entirely to the lives of Henry IV, William Shakespeare, and Isaac Newton, respectively. The Supplément to the Encyclopédie, run by a new editor, allowed for biographical articles under the subject's own name, which avoided some of the inconveniences of Jaucourt's system.

From the beginning, the Encyclopédie covered the science of grammar, but it was not intended to be a dictionary of the French language. As the work progressed, however, Diderot became more concerned about the role of language in the transmission of knowledge, and he began to include articles on ordinary language.

=== Religion ===
Some contributors to the Encyclopédie wrote about religion in an orthodox way, notably Edmé-François Mallet. By contrast, some challenged religious authority, locating religion within a system of reason and philosophy, and some doubted the reality of events in the Bible or questioned the existence of miracles such as the Resurrection.

To defend themselves from controversy, heterodox contributors often left their articles anonymous, hid criticism in obscure articles, or expressed it in ironic terms. At times, nonetheless, they openly attacked the Catholic Church, criticizing, for example, monasteries, the "excess" of religious festivals, or the celibacy of the clergy.

=== Politics and society ===
The Encyclopédie helped disseminate some of the Enlightenment's political theories. In famous articles such as "Political Authority", Diderot and other authors traced political authority back to ordinary people and away from divinity or princely lineages. This Enlightenment ideal, espoused by Rousseau and others, gave people the right to consent to their government in a kind of social contract.

Another component of the Encyclopédie's politics was advocacy for personal or natural rights. Articles such as "Natural Rights" by Diderot explored the relationship between individuals and the general will. To balance this relationship, humanity requires civil society and laws that benefit everyone. In varying degrees, contributors to the Encyclopédie criticized Thomas Hobbes' notions of a selfish humanity in need of a sovereign to rule over it.

On the matter of slavery, the Encyclopédie was, characteristically, ambivalent. While some authors reported on slavery matter-of-factly or even defended it, Jaucourt mounted an attack on the institution in his article "Slave Trade" ("Traite des nègres").

In economics, the Encyclopédie expressed favor for laissez-faire ideals or principles of economic liberalism. Articles on economics or markets, such as "Political Economy", generally favored competition and denounced monopolies, including guilds. Some contributors proposed extending laissez-faire principles beyond traditional markets, allowing, for example, schools to be privatized and careers opened to anyone.

=== Technology ===
The Encyclopédie was a vast compendium of knowledge, notably on the period's technology, the so-called mechanical arts. At the start of the project, Diderot had hoped to collect information on the mechanical arts by visiting workshops and interviewing artisans. Sometimes he did so, but in the end, much of the work's information on technology was taken from experts and books, notably the Descriptions des Arts et Métiers. Appearing as it did in the dawning Industrial Revolution, the Encyclopédie may come across as dated in its appreciation of technology, but some of the technology it overlooks (for example, the production of coke-smelted iron) was still little-known outside of Britain and Holland.

== Influence ==
By 1789, in its various editions, some 25,000 sets of the Encyclopédie had been sold throughout Europe. Chambers' (and then Abraham Rees's) much smaller Cyclopaedia went through more editions (including translations) and presumably sold in more sets, since at least one of the pressruns was as high as those of the Encyclopédie. Still, the third edition of the Encyclopaedia Britannica, which was almost as large as the Encyclopédie, sold 13,000 sets, half as many as the Encyclopédie, and the only eighteenth-century encyclopedia that was bigger than the Encyclopédie, the Grosses vollständiges Universal-Lexicon (1732–50), seems to have sold only 1,500 sets.

Unlike the Cyclopaedia, the Encyclopédie was never published in a comprehensive translation, though attempts at such a translation were made in English and German. In part, French, unlike Chambers' English, was understood by elites throughout Europe and elsewhere. More importantly, extracts were published in several languages, including the "Preliminary Discourse". In Russian, at least twenty-nine works were published between 1767 and 1805 based on articles from the Encyclopédie.

In the history of encyclopedias, the Encyclopédie was significant in several respects. It was the first encyclopedia known to have been written by numerous contributors, and it pioneered the practice of making ascriptions of authorship in individual articles. Whereas encyclopedia-like works from before the mid-eighteenth century were typically called dictionaries or lexica, the name encyclopedia was gradually adopted as the generic term for such works in the late eighteenth century, thanks to the prestige of the Cyclopaedia and especially the Encyclopédie.

"No encyclopaedia perhaps has been of such political importance, or has occupied so conspicuous a place in the civil and literary history of its century. It sought not only to give information, but to guide opinion," wrote the Encyclopædia Britannica in 1911. In fact, many encyclopedias throughout history have sought to promote their own point of view, from the warring Protestant and Catholic encyclopedias of the early modern period to the famous Nazi edition of Meyer's encyclopedia in the mid-twentieth century.

In The Encyclopédie and the Age of Revolution, Clorinda Donato writes the following:

The encyclopedians successfully argued and marketed their belief in the potential of reason and unified knowledge to empower human will and thus helped to shape the social issues that the French Revolution would address. Although it is doubtful whether the many artisans, technicians, or laborers whose work and presence are interspersed throughout the Encyclopédie actually read it, the recognition of their work as equal to that of intellectuals, clerics, and rulers prepared the terrain for demands for increased representation. Thus the Encyclopédie served to recognize and galvanize a new power base, ultimately contributing to the destruction of old values and the creation of new ones.

Once the French Revolution broke out, certainly, the Encyclopédie became associated with political revolution. The association was easy to make in that enemies of the Enlightenment often used the terms encyclopedist and philosophe as synonyms. In the early United States, enemies of Thomas Jefferson, who was sympathetic to the French Revolution and to revolution in general, criticized him, among other ways, by citing damning passages from the Encyclopédie, which he owned. Likewise, in 1814, a defender of the Spanish empire claimed that the struggle for Peruvian independence was "inspired by the doctrines of the encyclopedists".

== Statistics ==
Approximate size of the Encyclopédie:

- 17 volumes of articles, issued from 1751 to 1765
- 11 volumes of illustrations, issued from 1762 to 1772
- 18,000 pages of text
- 75,000 entries
  - 44,000 main articles
  - 28,000 secondary articles
  - 2,500 illustration indices
- 20,000,000 words in total

== Quotations ==
- "Reason is to the philosopher what grace is to the Christian... Other men walk in darkness; the philosopher, who has the same passions, acts only after reflection; he walks through the night, but it is preceded by a torch. The philosopher forms his principles on an infinity of particular observations. He does not confuse truth with plausibility; he takes for truth what is true, for forgery what is false, for doubtful what is doubtful, and probable what is probable. The philosophical spirit is thus a spirit of observation and accuracy." (Philosophers, Dumarsais)
- "If exclusive privileges were not granted, and if the financial system would not tend to concentrate wealth, there would be few great fortunes and no quick wealth. When the means of growing rich is divided between a greater number of citizens, wealth will also be more evenly distributed; extreme poverty and extreme wealth would be also rare." (Wealth, Diderot)

== See also ==
- Democratization of knowledge
