= Anne-Antoinette Diderot =

Wife of Denis Diderot

Anne-Antoinette Diderot (née Champion; 22 February 1710 – 10 April 1796) was the wife of the French pioneer encyclopedist Denis Diderot and the mother of his only surviving child, Marie-Angélique Diderot (1753–1824).

The marriage took place despite parental opposition and after dark on a Wednesday night, under conditions of secrecy. Sources indicate that the couple's life together was not without incident, but the marriage nevertheless endured from 1743 until the death of the philosopher in 1784.

== Life ==
=== Provenance ===
Anne Antoinette's mother was born Marie de Malleville in 1676, the daughter of a soldier from Le Mans. In 1709 she married a manual worker called Ambroise Champion (ca.1665–1713), from the same region. The couple are known to have had six children. Ambroise Champion took work manufacturing "Étamine", a type of rough cloth used to make clothes and as a cheese cloth: he experienced money problems and died, financially ruined, in 1713, at a hospital in La Ferté-Bernard.

His widow now relocated to Paris, accompanied by her youngest daughter, Anne Antoinette. The girl attended a monastic school till 1729. In 1741, using the name Nanette, she was living with her mother Marie Champion in the Rue Boutebrie, where both women were supporting themselves with laundry, sewing and lace making.

=== The path to marriage ===
In 1741, it was found that Denis Diderot living in a room in the same house as Anne-Antoinette and her mother. Early in 1743, having known them for approximately two years, knowing that she was a Catholic but also fully aware that no dowry would be involved, the philosopher decided he wished to marry Anne-Antoinette. He sought his father's permission, who opposed the idea and obtained a lettre de cachet (royal injunction) against the proposed marriage; he had Denis locked up in Carmelite Monastery in the countryside outside Troyes where he might reflect further on the matter.

Diderot was 29 at this time. The story of the prelude to the marriage between Denis and Anne-Antoinette Diderot is often repeated, incorporating the information that a decree of 1697 meant that a man marrying without his father's consent before he reached the age of 30 (or a girl marrying under a similar interdict before reaching the age of 25) must be disinherited by his (or her) parents. Other sources suggest that this simplifies the legal context to the point of misrepresenting it. In any event, after a few weeks Denis Diderot managed to escape his monastic imprisonment. In a letter written at the end of February 1743 to his future wife Diderot describes his incarceration, his monastic existence, the wickedness of the monks, and his overnight escape between a Sunday and a Monday. He had jumped out of a window and managed, at one stage, to find a stage coach connection to Troyes.

His letter spelled out that getting away from the monastery had involved significant weight loss because of the amount of walking he had had to undertake in the cold rain. He also wrote that he had hidden some money in his shirt tail as a precaution. Then he reached the central burden of his letter, which was that the rest of his life was dependent on her decision for or against him. Finally he reached Paris. Anne-Antoinette let it be known unambiguously that she had no wish to marry into a family in which she was not welcome; and that he should stop trying to contact her. Later, however, mother and daughter had a change of heart, and during the night of 6 November 1743, one month after Diderot's thirtieth birthday, the two of them were secretly married in the church of Saint-Pierre-aux-Bœufs, one of the few Paris churches prepared to hold a marriage service without evidence of parental approval for the solemnisation ceremony. Didier Diderot only found out about his son's marriage six years later.

=== Married life ===
==== The children ====
Once married the Diderots moved into their first home together, in the Rue Saint-Victor, close to the Place Maubert in what is today the 5th arrondissement of Paris. It was here that on 13 August 1744 she gave birth to their first child, their daughter Angelique who the next day, 14 August 1744, was christened at the church of Saint-Nicolas-du-Chardonnet. The godparents were Auguste Blanchard, an official of the church, and Marie-Catherine Léger, the widow of François Lefebvre. After six weeks Angelique died on 29 September 1744. By 1746 the family were living in the Rue Traversière, and that year they moved again to an address in the Rue Mouffetard, but they continued to live in the same part of Paris near the Place Maubert. Their two sons, François Jacques and Denis-Laurant, both died in infancy. Their fourth child, Marie Angélique Diderot (1753–1824) achieved some notability on her own account as a talented musician-instrumentalist. In 1772 she married Abel Caroillon de Vandeul (1746–1813), the son of an industrialist, and is sometimes identified in sources as Marie Angélique de Vandeul.

==== Tensions ====
Denis Diderot is known as a writer, and in surviving letters he wrote with evident candour about himself. The first of his recorded extramarital liaisons took place in 1745 and involved Madeleine de Puisieux. One of Diderot's friends, the prolific writer Jean-Jacques Rousseau, described the marriage of his friends Denis and "Nanette" in his autobiography, Les Confessions. He highlighted the contrast between his own marriage and that of the Diderots, describing Anne-Antoinette as "quarrelsome".

Mme Diderot's name appears in a police report dated 2 April 1750, involving an official rebuke in connection with an affair involving household servants, which appears to provide evidence for an unruly temperament or at least of a certain impulsiveness. The report indicates that she struck a servant with her foot and pushed his head against a wall. Despite evidence of tensions and not withstanding Diderot's infidelities, the marriage proved resilient, based on a relationship of mutual support. During the second half of 1749, Diderot was imprisoned at Vincennes and was visited by his wife. Later, when she fell ill (probably with dysentery) in 1762, he looked after her with great dedication. In an intellectual milieu characterised by religious scepticism, he defended her religious convictions against critics. The marriage appears to have become less turbulent in later years.

=== Final years ===
Her granddaughter, Marie-Anne Caroillon "Minette" de Vandeul died aged eleven in April 1784. By this time her husband's health was failing, and Denis died at the end of July 1784. Anne-Antoinette lived her final years with her daughter's family, including her grandson Denis-Simon Caroillon "Fanfan" de Vandeul.
