= Laurent Durand =

French publisher (1712 – 1763)

Laurent Durand (1712, Paris – 1763) was an 18th-century French publisher active in the Age of Enlightenment. His shop was established rue Saint-Jacques under the sign Saint Landry & du griffon.

Durand was the son of a merchant born near Auxerre. From 1730, he worked for the Parisian bookseller and printer Jacques Chardon (1688-1766). On 31 January 1739, he married Elizabeth Carbonnier, a niece of a certain François Jouenne.

He was one of the four publishers of the Encyclopédie of Diderot and d'Alembert, along with Michel-Antoine David, André le Breton, and Antoine-Claude Briasson. He also was Denis Diderot's main publisher as well as that of several clandestine books.

== Works published ==
- 1739: Année ecclésiastique ou Instructions sur le propre du tems, tome septième, à Paris, rue Saint-Jacques, chez Jacques Lambert et Laurent Durand, à la Sagesse et Saint Landry, 660 p.
- 1741: M. l'abbé Lebeuf, L'état des sciences en France, depuis la mort du roy Robert, arrivée en 1031, jusqu'à celle de Philippe le Bel, arrivée en 1314, À Paris, rue S. Jacques, chez Lambert & Durand, à la Sagesse, & à Saint Landry
- 1744: Henry Baker, trad. de l'anglois by P. Demours, Essai sur l'histoire naturelle du polybe
- le Thieullier, Louis-Jean (1745). Consultations de médecine (in French). Vol. III. Paris. pp. XVI-480.
- 1745: Denis Diderot, Essai sur le mérite et la vertu
- 1745: M. Lesser, avec des remarques de M. P. Lyonnet, Theologie des insectes, ou démonstration des perfections de Dieu dans tout ce qui concerne les insectes, first volume, 384 p.
- 1746: Denis Diderot, Pensées philosophiques
- 1751–1763, Encyclopédie ou Dictionnaire raisonné des sciences, des arts et des métiers.
- 1754: Catalogue des livres imprimés, ou qui se trouvent en nombre chez Durand, Rue du Foin-Saint-Jacques, en entrant par la rue S. Jacques, la premiere porte cochere à droite, à S. Landry, 15 p.
- 1759: M. Demours, Table générale des matières contenues dans l'histoire & dans les mémoires de l'Académie générale des sciences, 1741-1750, tome VI, in-4°

== Bibliography ==
- Frank A. Kafker, Jeff Loveland, Diderot et Laurent Durand, son éditeur principal, Recherches sur Diderot et sur l'Encyclopédie, 2005, n° 39, (p. 29–40).
