= Bénigne Dujardin =

French writer, historian and translator

Bénigne Dujardin (French pronunciation: [beniɲ dyʒaʁdɛ̃]; 1689, Paris – 1771?) was a French writer, historian and translator.

He was received Master of Requests in 1722 but did not carry this title in 1738, likely because he fell out of favor. He then devoted himself to literature under the pseudonym (de) Boispréaux and in particular to translation, in association with Gottfried Sellius.

In response to criticism by Fréron on his work, he published the Anti-feuilles, ou Lettres à madame de ***, on some judgments in the Année littéraire, in collaboration with Gottfried Sellius and Jacques Rochette de La Morlière (Amsterdam, Le Juste et Paris, Quillau, 1754).

== Works ==
- L'Histoire de Nicolas Rienzy, Paris, Michel-Antoine David, Piget, Prault fils, 1743 (Read online).
- Anti-feuilles, ou Lettres à madame de ***, sur quelques jugemens portés dans l'Année littéraire, in collaboration with Gottfried Sellius and Jacques Rochette de La Morlière, Amsterdam, Le Juste; Paris, Quillau, vol. 1, 1754 (Read online).
- Le mariage de la raison avec l'esprit, one-act comedy in verse, Paris, Prault le Jeune, 1754, 32 p. (Read online).
- Histoire générale des Provinces-Unies, with Gottfried Sellius, Paris, P.G. Simon, 1757-1770. Partially translated from L'histoire de la patrie by Jan Wagenaar.
- Avis des éditeurs des trois derniers volumes de l'Histoire générale des Provinces-Unies (prospectus), Pierre-Guillaume Simon, Jean-Michel Papillon, Bénigne Dujardin and Gottfried Sellius, Paris, chez P. G. Simon, Imprimeur du Parlement, rue de la Harpe, à l'Hercule, 1770.

== Translations ==
- Petronius, Satyre, London (The Hague ?), J. Nourse, 1742, 2 vol.
- Satires by Gottlieb Wilhelm Rabener, Paris, 1754, 4 vol. in-12°.
- Vie de P. Aretin, The Hague, J. Neaulme, 1750; free translation of the text by Giammaria Mazzucchelli.
- La double beauté, novel, Cantorbury (i.e. Paris), 1754, in-12°. It is one episode from the Mémoires de Martin Scriblerus by Alexander Pope, Bremen, 1748.

== Sources ==
- « Bénigne Dujardin » in Joseph Fr. Michaud, Biographie universelle, ancienne et moderne Paris, L.-G. Michaud, 1837, suppl., vol. 63, p. 94-95.
