= Rameau's Nephew =

Imaginary philosophical Dialogue by Denis Diderot

Rameau's Nephew, or the Second Satire
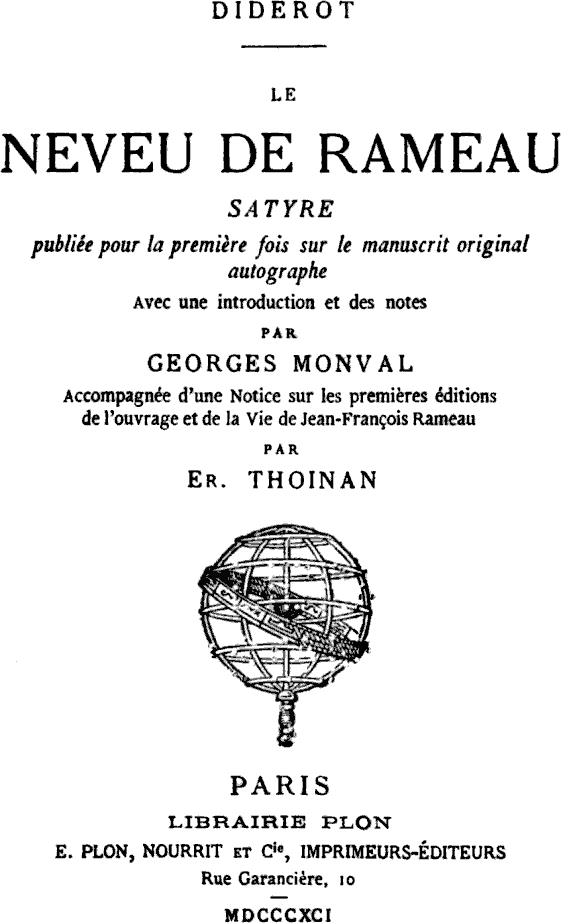
- Author: Denis Diderot
- Original title: Le Neveu de Rameau ou La Satire seconde
- Language: French
- Genre: Philosophical novel
- Publication date: 1805, 1891
- Publication place: France

Rameau's Nephew, or the Second Satire (or The Nephew of Rameau, French: Le Neveu de Rameau ou La Satire seconde) is an imaginary philosophical conversation written by the French philosopher and art critic Denis Diderot, probably written between 1761 and 1774.

It was first published in 1805 in German translation by Goethe, but the French manuscript used had subsequently disappeared. The German version was translated back into French by de Saur and Saint-Geniès and published in 1821. The first published version based on French manuscript appeared in 1823 in the Brière edition of Diderot's works. Modern editions are based on the complete manuscript in Diderot's own hand found by Georges Monval, the librarian at the Comédie-Française in 1890, while buying music scores from a second-hand bookshop in Paris. Monval published his edition of the manuscript in 1891. Subsequently, the manuscript was bought by the Pierpont Morgan Library in New York.

According to Andrew S. Curran, Diderot did not publish the dialogue during his lifetime because his portrayals of famous musicians, politicians and financiers would have warranted his arrest.

== Description ==
The recounted story takes place in the Café de la Régence, where Moi ("Me"), a narrator-like persona (often mistakenly supposed to stand for Diderot himself), describes for the reader a recent encounter he has had with the character Lui ("Him"), referring to—yet not literally meaning—Jean-François Rameau, the nephew of the famous composer, who has engaged him in an intricate battle of wits, self-reflexivity, allegory and allusion. Lui defends a worldview based on cynicism, hedonism and materialism.

Recurring themes in the discussion include the Querelle des Bouffons (the French/Italian opera battle), education of children, the nature of genius and money. The often rambling conversation pokes fun at numerous prominent figures of the time.

In the prologue that precedes the conversation, the first-person narrator frames Lui as eccentric and extravagant, full of contradictions, "a mixture of the sublime and the base, of good sense and irrationality". Effectively being a provocateur, Lui seemingly extols the virtues of crime and theft, raising love of gold to the level of a religion. Moi appears initially to have a didactic role, while the nephew (Lui) succeeds in conveying a cynical, if perhaps immoral, vision of reality.

According to Andrew S. Curran, the main themes of this work are the consequences of God's non-existence for the possibility of morality and the distinction between human beings and animals.

Michel Foucault, in his Madness and Civilization, saw in the ridiculous figure of Rameau's nephew a kind of exemplar of a uniquely modern incarnation of the Buffoon.

== Summary ==
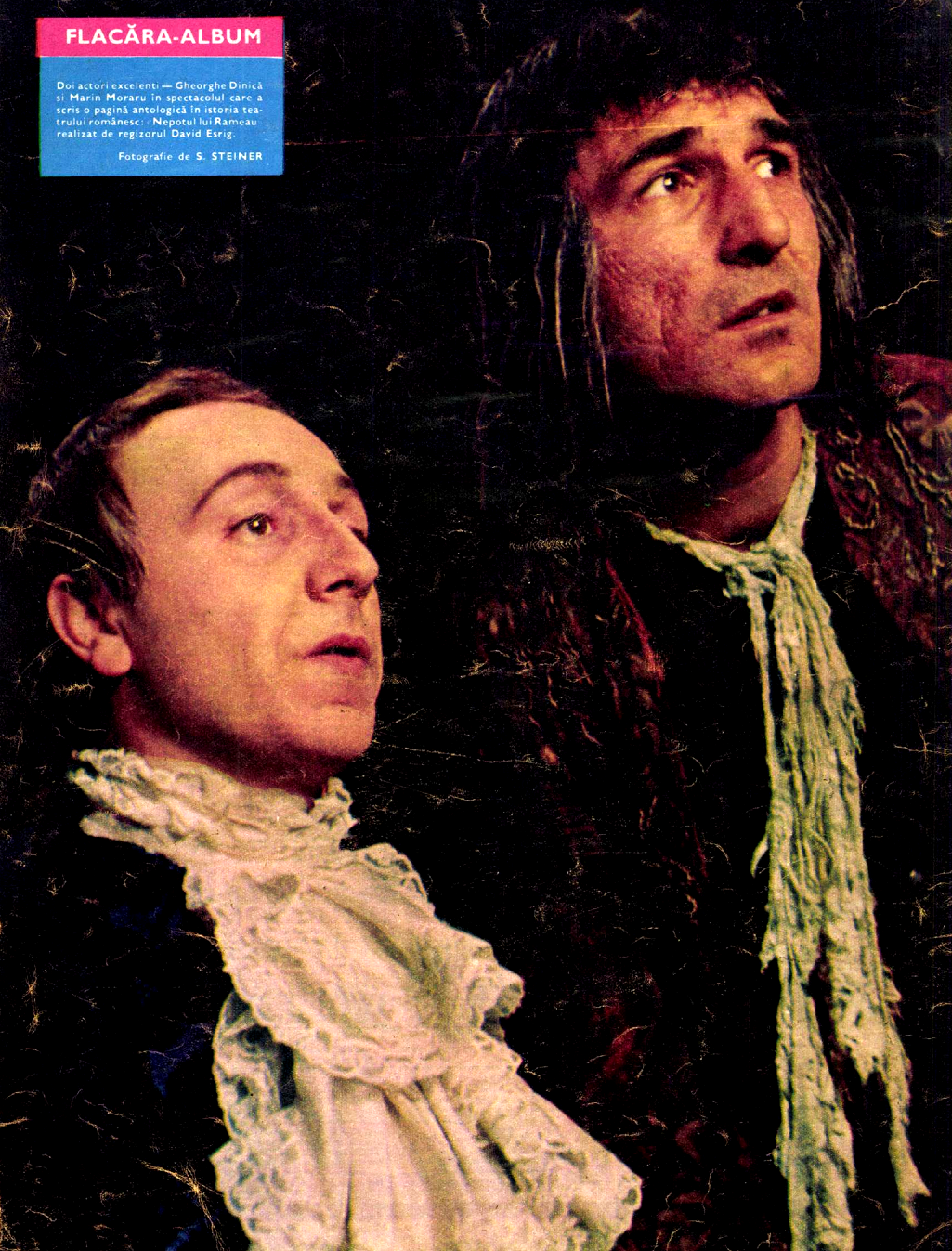
Gheorghe Dinică (on the right) and Marin Moraru in David Esrig's 1968 production of the play (Nepotul lui Rameau Bulandra Theater, Bucharest); photograph by S. Steiner for Flacăra

=== Preface ===
The narrator has made his way to his usual haunt on a rainy day, the Café de la Régence, France's chess mecca, where he enjoys watching such masters as Philidor or Legall. He is accosted by an eccentric figure: I do not esteem such originals. Others make them their familiars, even their friends. Such a man will draw my attention perhaps once a year when I meet him because his character offers a sharp contrast with the usual run of men, and a break from the dull routine imposed by one's education, social conventions and manners. When in company, he works as a pinch of leaven, causing fermentation and restoring each to his natural bend. One feels shaken and moved; prompted to approve or blame; he causes truth to shine forth, good men to stand out, villains to unmask. Then will the wise man listen and get to know those about him.

=== Dialogue ===
The dialogue form allows Diderot to examine issues from widely different perspectives. The character of Rameau's nephew is presented as extremely unreliable, ironical and self-contradicting, so that the reader may never know whether he is being sincere or provocative. The impression is that of nuggets of truth artfully embedded in trivia.

A parasite in a well-to-do family, Rameau's nephew has recently been kicked out because he refused to compromise with the truth. Now he will not humble himself by apologizing. And yet, rather than starve, shouldn't one live at the expense of rich fools and knaves as he once did, pimping for a lord? Society does not allow the talented to support themselves because it does not value them, leaving them to beg while the rich, the powerful and stupid poke fun at men like Buffon, Duclos, Montesquieu, Rousseau, Voltaire, D'Alembert and Diderot. The poor genius is left with but two options: to crawl and flatter or to dupe and cheat, either being repugnant to the sensitive mind. If virtue had led the way to fortune, I would either have been virtuous or pretended to be so like others; I was expected to play the fool, and a fool I turned myself into.

== History ==
In Rameau's Nephew, Diderot attacked and ridiculed the critics of the Enlightenment, but he knew from past experience that some of his enemies were sufficiently powerful to have him arrested or the work banned. Diderot had been imprisoned in 1749 after publishing his Lettre sur les aveugles (Letter about the Blind) and his Encyclopédie had been banned in 1759. Prudence, therefore, may have dictated that he showed it only to a select few.

After the death of Diderot, a copy of the manuscript was sent to Russia, along with Diderot's other works. In 1765, Diderot had faced financial difficulties, and the Empress Catherine the Great of Russia had come to his help by buying out his library. The arrangement was quite a profitable one for both parties, Diderot becoming the paid librarian of his own book collection, with the task of adding to it as he saw fit, while the Russians enjoyed the prospect of one day being in possession of one of the most selectively stocked European libraries, not to mention Diderot's papers.

An appreciative Russian reader communicated the work to Schiller, who shared it with Goethe who translated it into German in 1805. The first published French version was actually a translation back into French from Goethe's German version. This motivated Diderot's daughter to publish a doctored version of the manuscript. In 1890, the librarian Georges Monval found a copy of Rameau's Nephew by Diderot's own hand while browsing the bouquinistes along the Seine. This complete version is now in a vault in the Pierpont Morgan Library in New York City.

Hegel quotes Rameau's Nephew in §522 and §545 of his Phenomenology of Spirit.

== English translations ==
- Jacques Barzun and Ralph H. Bowen: Rameau's Nephew and Other Works (The Library of Liberal Arts, 1964)
- Leonard Tancock: Rameau's Nephew and D'Alembert's Dream (Penguin, 1966)
- Ian C. Johnston: Rameau's Nephew (2002)
- Margaret Mauldon: Rameau's Nephew and First Satire (Oxford, 2006)
- Kate E. Tunstall and Caroline Warman: Denis Diderot's 'Rameau's Nephew': A Multi-Media Edition (Open Book Publishers, 2014; revised 2015)
