= Mélanie de Salignac =

French musician

Mélanie de Salignac (1741-1763) was a blind French musician whose achievements in the face of her disability were mentioned in the accounts of Diderot.

She was born at the Château de Mons (Charente-Maritime), the daughter of financier Pierre Vallet de Salignac and Marie-Jeanne Élisabeth Volland, who was the sister of Sophie Volland. Her older brother was the politician Nicolas-Thérèse Vallet de Salignac.

She was born blind long before the invention of Braille in 1829, but taught herself to read using cut out card letters and achieved much more through her sense of touch. She devised a tactile version of music notation, which she used to read compositions and correspond with friends.

Diderot wrote about her achievements in his "Addition to the Letter on the Blind". He noted that she had learned some algebra, geometry, geography and astronomy. She wrote by pricking a pin on a stretched out piece of paper and read books which were printed especially for her. She also sewed and played card games. He took inspiration from her skills and believed that blind people should be educated based on their existing skillset, rather than their lack of sight.

== Legacy ==
Valentin Haüy started teaching blind students just two years after Diderot’s “Addition to the Letter on the Blind” was published. It is believed that he was inspired by De Salignac and another blind musician, Maria Theresia von Paradis.
