= Madeleine de Puisieux =

French writer and proto-feminist (1720–1798)

- Born: 28 November 1720; Paris, France
- Died: 12 April 1798 (aged 77); Paris, France

Madeleine d'Arsant de Puisieux (12 April 1720 – 28 November 1798) was a French writer and proto-feminist.

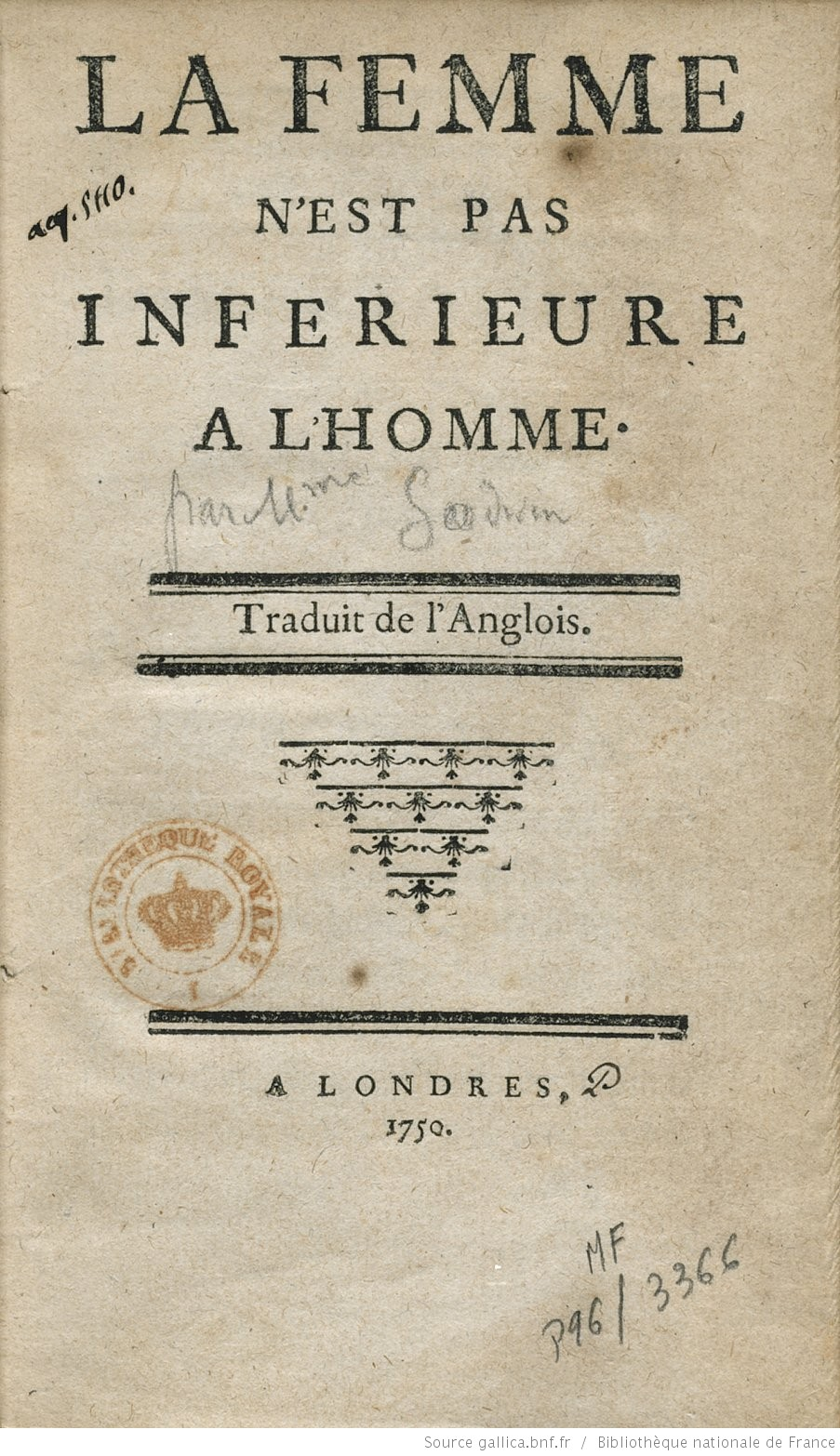
Cover of the well known publication, La Femme n'est pas inférieure à l'homme that Puisieux published in 1750.

== Life ==
Madeleine de Puisieux, was born in Paris on 28 November 1720. Although not much is known about her early life, Puisieux worked to become a published author. In 1745, she achieved her goal and with the help of her friend, Denis Diderot she published one of her first works entitled Les Caractères sometime in the year 1750.

In the year 1750, Madeleine de Puisieux met and fell in love with Philippe-Florent de Puisieux, a lawyer French ambassador to Switzerland and a well-known lawyer at the Paris parliament, eventually marrying him.

Madeleine de Puisieux had a longtime relationship with fellow philosopher, art critic, Denis Diderot from 1746 to 1755. Although never married, she was the kept woman to Diderot during their time together. In that time, they worked together on some of Puisieux's works, as he helped get the works published. The relationship was not exclusive and Diderot also had relationships with Sophie Volland, and Mme de Maux. Throughout her relationships, Puisieux had no children.

On 12 April 1798, Madeleine de Puisieux died in her hometown in Paris at the age of 77 years old.

== Achievements ==
Puisieux published one of her most famous works in 1750 entitled, La femme n'est pas inférieure à l'homme ('Woman is Not Inferior to Man'). This was a publication of a previously anonymous piece where Puisieux translated and brought up topics in the book about the equality of sexes. She based these questions found in the 1405 publication, La Cité des dames ('The City of Ladies') by Christine de Pisan. The following year, it was republished under the title Le Triomphe des dames ('The Triumph of Ladies'). It is sometimes debated whether Puisieux's future husband Philippe-Florent de Puisieux (1713–1772) helped Puisieux with the translations used in the final publication.

She sought opportunities to help the younger generation of girls by publishing advice books for girls. This made her name a well-known one among the population as Puisieux wanted to encourage girls to know about gender equality with feminism as her platform of teaching.

With the wide known success of her works, Puisieux was recognised by Louis XV. After the death of Louis XV in 1774, she settled down with her husband and was awarded a state pension in 1795.

== Works ==
- Alzarac, ou La nécessité d'être inconstant, Cologne, Paris, Charpentier, 1762
- Conseils à une amie, Amsterdam, Aux dépens de la Compagnie, 1751
- Histoire de Mademoiselle de Terville, Amsterdam, Veuve Duchesne, 1768
- Le Goût de bien des gens, ou, Recueil de contes, tant en vers qu'en prose, Amsterdam, Changuion, 1769
- Le Plaisir et la volupté : conte allégorique, Paphos, [s.n.], 1752
- L'Éducation du marquis de *** ou Mémoires de la comtesse de Zurlac, Berlin, Fouché, 1753
- Les Caractères, Londres [Paris], S.n., 1750–1751
- Mémoires d'un Homme de Bien, Paris, Delalain, 1768
- Réflexions et avis sur les défauts et les ridicules a la mode. Pour servir de suite aux conseils à une amie, Paris, Brunet, 1761
- Zamor et Almanzine, ou L'inutilité de l'esprit et du bon sens, Amsterdam, Hochereau l'aîné, 1755

== External link ==
- Works by or about Madeleine de Puisieux at the Internet Archive
