= Sur les femmes =

Sur les femmes (Essay on Women) is an essay by Denis Diderot published in Correspondance littéraire in 1772. It contains a response to Antoine Léonard Thomas's Essay on the Character, Morals, and Mind of Women in Different Centuries, which was also published in 1772, and includes Diderot's own views on the subject. (Note: Fellows, in his biography of Diderot, uses the French name of the essay throughout, and does not mention the English name at all. Wilson mentions the English name once, but subsequently uses the French name whenever referring to this essay. Another biography of Diderot, by P.N. Furbank, does not mention this essay at all.)

== Background ==
Besides the interest in responding to Thomas's essay, there occurred two incidents in Diderot's personal life at this time, both involving women, which are believed to have played a role in his crafting of this essay. The first of these was that although he remained friends with Mme de Maux, their romantic relationship had come to an end. The second was that his daughter Angélique had become engaged to Caroillon de Vandeul whom she would later marry. But, simultaneously, Angélique's harpsichord teacher, who would regularly enjoy the hospitality of the Diderot household, had become persona non grata in Diderot's house. There is speculation that he may have made unwelcome advances towards Angélique.

== Content ==
Diderot begins the essay by commending Thomas' independence and nobility, but then criticizes him for lacking feeling. According to Diderot, "when writing about women, we must dip our pens in the rainbow and dry the ink with the dust of butterfly wings." He goes on to describe women as "beautiful as the seraphim of Klopstock, terrible as the devils of Milton"; and provides further evidence that he is writing from a male perspective when he states that "The symbol of woman in general is that of the Apocalypse, on the forehead of which is written: Mystery."

The essay then goes on to present original views on the legal status of wives; and the effect of sexual arousal, sexual hysteria, menstruation, pregnancy, and menopause in women. Diderot also weighs in on what he considers some extremes present in women; he comments that they may faint on seeing a spider or a mouse, but that they are also capable of withstanding the greatest horrors known to humanity. He characterizes women as being relentless in love and ruthless in hate.

Diderot also notes that in almost every country Nature and civil laws have combined in a way that is cruel to women. He states that women have been treated like imbecile children; and blames men for exercising unbridled harassment on women.

=== On the words "I love you" ===
In the essay, Diderot gives his interpretation of the words "I love you":

What is the meaning of that declaration so lightly made, so capriciously interpreted, "I love you"? Its true meaning is: "If you would only sacrifice your innocence and your morals to my desires, lose your self-esteem and the respect of others, move in society with eyes downcast, at least until you have become sufficiently accustomed to wantonness to acquire the brazen conduct that accompanies it, abandon all thought of a respected place in society, cause your parents to die of grief, and give me a moment of pleasure, I shall be much obliged."

== Reception ==
Wilson comments that, although Diderot writes this essay from a male perspective, he is more empathetic towards women than most writers of his time. Fellows suggests that Diderot's interpretation of the words "I love you" may have been propelled by the behavior of Angélique's tutor towards her. In her essay "Sexual/Textual Politics in the Enlightenment: Diderot and d'Epinay Respond to Thomas's Essay on Women" Illinois State University professor Mary Trouille comments that "Oscillating continually between an attitude of sympathy and scorn for women, between images of idealization and vituperation, Diderot (like Thomas) leaves the reader perplexed and uncertain as to his true beliefs. One has the impression that Sur Les Femmes is a mere exercise in rhetoric intended less to persuade, than to impress and entertain."
