= Louis-Claude Brullé =

French printer and Encyclopédiste

Louis-Claude Brullé (died 8 January 1772 in Paris) was an 18th-century French printer and Encyclopédiste.

From 1752 until 1765, Brullé was a foreman in the printing company of André le Breton, one of the four publishers of the Encyclopédie. Brullé helped his employer to censor this book, which earned him the lasting resentment of Diderot.

Brullé wrote the articles Imprimerie and Prote for the Encyclopédie.
