= Letter on the Deaf and Dumb =

1751 work by Denis Diderot

Letter on the Deaf and Dumb, for the Use of those who hear and speak (French: Lettre sur les sourds et muets a l'usage de ceux qui entendent et qui parlent) is a work by Denis Diderot containing a psychological investigation on the deaf-mute. It was published in 1751. It was meant to be a companion volume to Diderot's Letter on the Blind.

== Content ==
The book consists of an enquiry into the method of communication used by deaf-mutes, and seeks to shed light on the origin of language by observing the gestures, and response to gestures, of deaf-mutes.
