= The Skeptic's Walk =

Book by Denis Diderot

La Promenade du sceptique
- Author: Denis Diderot
- Language: French
- Publication date: 1830
- Publication place: France

The Skeptic's Walk (French: La Promenade du sceptique) is a book by Denis Diderot, completed in 1747. It was first published in 1830. The book is separated into two parts: the first being a critique of religion, and the second a philosophical dialogue.

== Production ==
The book was reported to the Paris police between 1746 and 1747, a time when Diderot was already under police surveillance. When the book was completed in 1747, Diderot failed to find a publisher, and the only copy remained at his home until it was seized during a police search in 1752. The book was reportedly lost in police custody and remained unknown until a Paris bookseller put it up for auction in 1800. Its reappearance sparked a legal dispute between Diderot's daughter and the bookseller over rightful ownership. This led to the book being confiscated by the police for a second time. It stayed unpublished until 1830.Diderot had died in 1784, so the publication was posthumous.

== Content ==
The book is said to reveal the intellectual development of Diderot during the time it was written, and is considered to be the turning point in Diderot's transition to atheism. The book questions the integrity of both the Bible and the Abrahamic conception of God. Part of the book presents a fictional story, set shortly after the Battle of Fontenoy, involving a small group of philosophers. Themes include choosing between carnal pleasures and 'higher' morals. The book ends with the narrator of the story meeting "one of those blondes whom a philosopher ought to avoid", who convinces him that it is better to embrace happiness on earth than to wait for it in heaven. Philosophical debate in the book is said to show Diderot's distinct withdrawal from the Age of Enlightenment.

The book has been described as being highly satirical, and whilst it mainly criticises the Christian churches, it has also been called Diderot's "most unkind treatment of Judaism and the ancient Jews." Because of the blasphemy laws at the time, if the book had been published while he was still alive, Diderot most likely would have been imprisoned or exiled from Paris.
