= Jacques Rochette de La Morlière =

French playwright

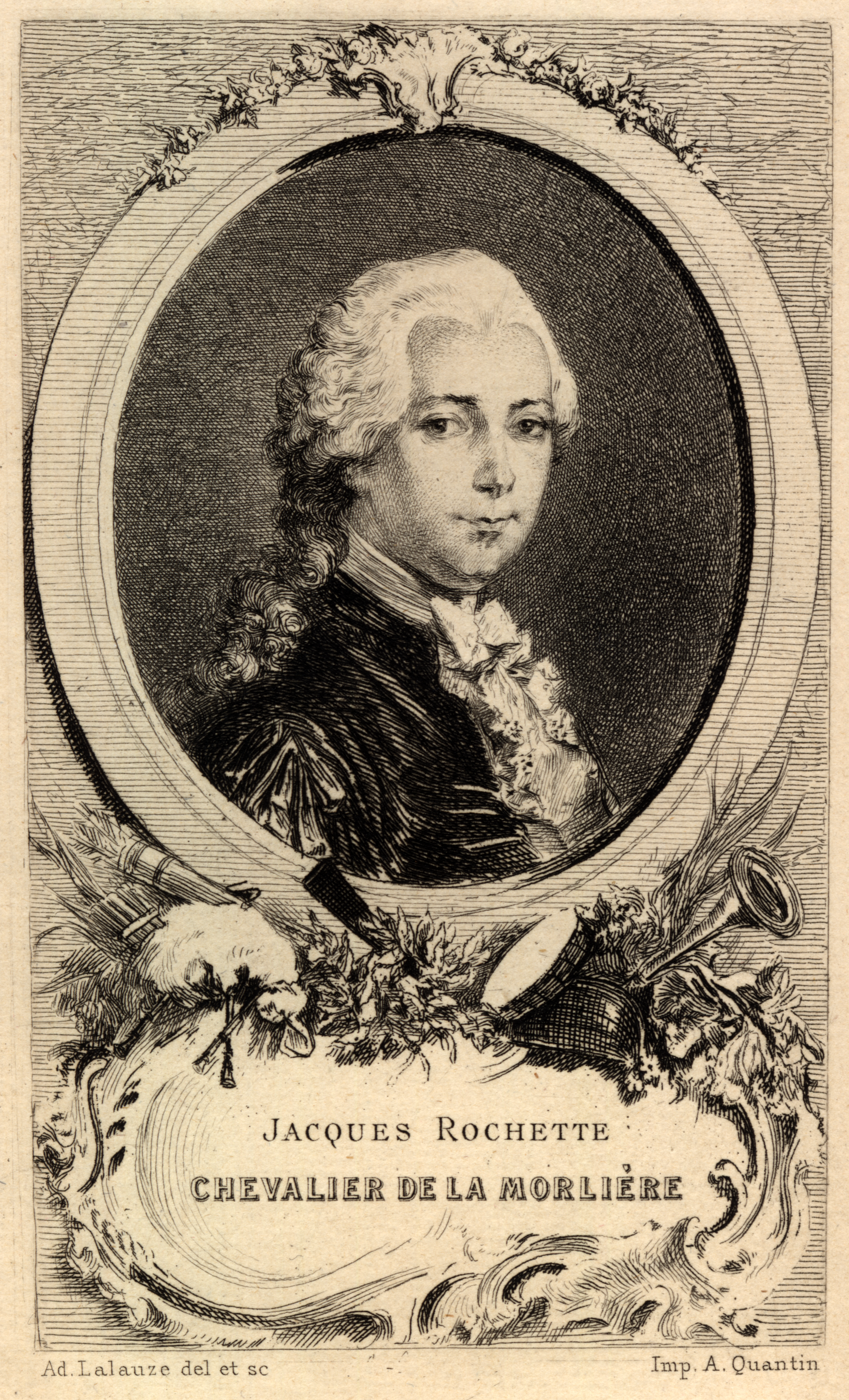
- Jacques Rochette de La Morlière.
- Born: Charles-Jacques-Louis-Auguste Rochette de La Morlière; 22 April 1719; Grenoble, France
- Died: 22 April 1785 (aged 66); Paris, France
- Occupation: Playwright

Charles-Jacques-Louis-Auguste Rochette de La Morlière (known as "Le Chevalier"; 22 April 1719 – 9 February 1785) was an 18th-century French playwright.

== Biography ==
An unscrupulous schemer, La Morlière first sought the support of the party of Voltaire, applauding the verse of the master, and when he found himself sufficiently established at café Procope, became an entrepreneur of success and dramatic falls. Surrounded by a paid gang, he moved to the parterre, giving the signal for applause for authors who had offered him some dinners or a few louis, and the signal for whistles against those from whom he had received nothing. In order to replace the whistle that the police did not always tolerate, he had imagined a sort of protracted yawn that produced a disastrous effect.

Believing himself master of the theater, La Morlière had the idea to use his means of action for his own account and wrote comedies but, despite all the efforts of his cabal, they fell, and with them his influence. Fréron, who he had attacked, gave him the final blow. Accused of baseness and cowardice and also of relations with the police, he was abandoned by everyone and ended his life in deep poverty.

He was among the regulars of Marie Anne Doublet's salon.

== Works (in French original) ==
- 1746: Angola, histoire indienne, 2 vol. in-12, libertine novels reminding those of Crébillon fils.
- 1748: Les Lauriers ecclésiastiques ou Campagnes de l’abbé de T…, De l'Imprimerie ordinaire du clergé, Luxuropolis (Paris), 1 vol. in-8.
- 1749: Mirza-Nadir ou Mémoires et avantures du marquis de St. T***, gouverneur pour le roi de Perse de la ville du pays de Candahar, The Hague, 4 vol. in-12°
- 1752: Observations sur la tragédie du duc de Faix, de M. de Voltaire, in-12°
- 1754: Le Contrepoison des feuilles ou Lettres sur Fréron, in-12°
- 1769: Le Fatalisme ou Collection d’anecdotes pour prouver l’influence du sort sur l’histoire du cœur humain, work dedicated to Mme Du Barry, 2 vol. in-12°

His comedies in prose Le Gouverneur, three acts (1751), La Créole, one act (1754) and L’Amant déguisé, two acts (1758) seem not to have been printed.

In addition, he collaborated on the Anti-feuilles by Bénigne Dujardin.

== Works (in English translation) ==
- A Coming of Age (aka: The Ecclesiastical Laurels). New Urge Editions/Black Scat Books. 2020. ISBN 9781734816679.
- Ecclesiastical Laurels: or Abbot T***'s Campaigns with the Triumph of the Nuns). Sunny Lou Publishing. 2020. ISBN 9781735477657.

== Sources ==
- Gustave Vapereau, Dictionnaire universel des littératures, Paris, Hachette, 1876, (p. 1178–1179)
- Norbert Crochet: Le Chevalier de la Morlière. Angola, histoire indienne (1746). 2009, (ISBN 978-1-4452-3259-1).
- Jean Louis Fabier: Critique d'Angola (1746). Complete text, 2009, (ISBN 978-1-4452-3259-1). (With a detailed biographical preface)
- Thomas M. Kavanagh: Mirroring Pleasure. La Morlières Angola. In: Enlightenment Pleasures: 18th century France and the New Epicureanism. Yale University Press, 2012, (ISBN 978-0-300-14094-1), pp. 52–70.
- Octave Uzanne: Notices sur la vie et de les œuvres de La Morlière. Foreword to: Contes du Chevalier de La Morlière: Angola. Quantin, Paris 1879.
- Charles Monselet: Les aveux d'un pamphlétaire. V. Lecou, Paris, 1854.
- Yong-Mi Quester: Frivoler Import : die Rezeption freizügiger französischer Romane in Deutschland (1730 bis 1800); with an annotated translation bibliography. Tübingen : Niemeyer 2006. Zugl.: Freiburg (Breisgau), Univ., Diss., 2005
