= La Religieuse (novel) =

Novel by Denis Diderot

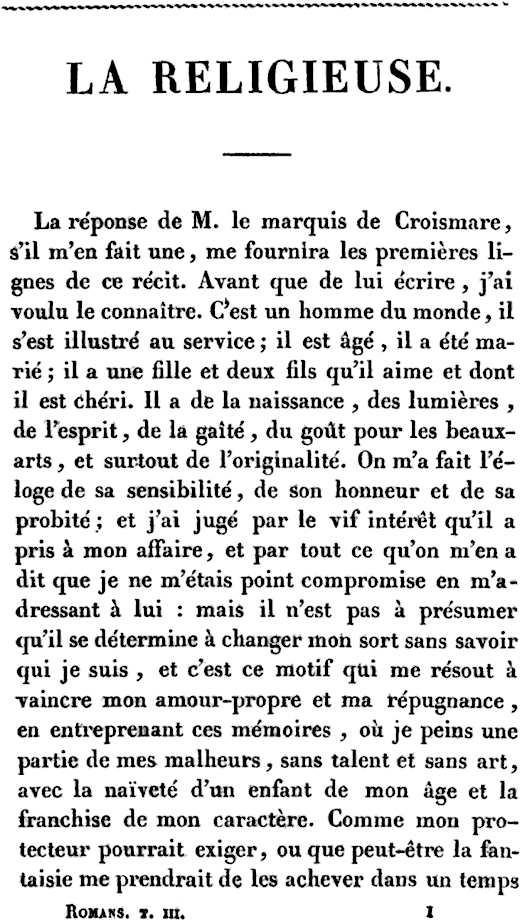
La Religieuse (novel)

La Religieuse (also called The Nun or Memoirs of a Nun) is an 18th-century French novel by Denis Diderot. Completed in about 1780, it was first published by Friedrich Melchior Grimm in 1792 (eight years after Diderot's death) in his Correspondance littéraire in Saxony, and subsequently in 1796 in France.

== Background ==
The novel began not as a work for literary consumption, but as an elaborate practical joke aimed at luring the Marquis de Croismare, a companion of Diderot's, back to Paris. The novel consists of a series of letters purporting to be from a nun, Suzanne, who implores the Marquis to help her renounce her vows, and describes her intolerable life in the convent to which she has been committed against her will.

In 1758, the Marquis involved himself in a controversial case where a nun, Marguerite Delamarre, was trying to be dispensed from her vows and return to society. The Marquis pitied Marguerite and unsuccessfully tried to use his political influence to liberate her. After losing the case in 1758, Marguerite was forced to remain in the convents for the rest of her life. Diderot used Marguerite Delamarre as a prototype for Suzanne, thinking Croismare would be persuaded to return to Paris in order to save Suzanne from her misery in the convent.

Eventually, this practical joke turned into a passionate project for Diderot, in which he self-identifies as a woman. Diderot later revised the letters into a novel depicting corruption that was supposedly rampant among the clergy and in religious institutions. When Diderot publicly admitted his role in the ruse, the Marquis is said to have laughed at the revelation, unsurprisingly since he had behaved with exemplary compassion and generosity in his willingness to help the imaginary Suzanne.

== Plot ==
The story takes place at an undetermined date during the eighteenth century. Suzanne Simonin is an intelligent and sensitive sixteen-year-old French girl who is forced against her will into Longchamp Abbey, a Catholic convent, by her parents. Suzanne's parents initially inform her that she is being sent to the convent for financial reasons, stating it is cheaper for her to become a nun rather than paying a dowry in marriage. However, while in the convent, it is revealed to Suzanne that she is actually there because she is an illegitimate child, as her mother committed adultery with another man. By sending Suzanne to the convent, her mother thought she could make amends for her sins by using her daughter as a sacrificial offering for a new salvation.

At the convent, Suzanne suffers humiliation, harassment and violence because she refuses to make the vows of the religious community. Suzanne agrees to enter into the sisterhood; however, she is placed in isolation for six months for her reluctance to take her vows. Suzanne eventually finds companionship with the Mother Superior, Sister de Moni, as she pities Suzanne's anguish. In the days leading up her death, Sister de Moni comforts Suzanne through prayer and her understanding of Suzanne's torment in the convent.

Sister de Moni is succeeded by Sister Sainte-Christine, who does not share the same empathy for Suzanne that her predecessor had. In fact, the new Mother Superior blames Suzanne for the death of Sister de Moni and for the unrest the convent faces under the new leadership. Suzanne is physically and mentally harassed by Sister Sainte-Christine, almost to the point of death.

Suzanne contacts her lawyer, Monsieur Manouri, who attempts to legally free her from her vows. She loses the legal battle; however, Monsieur Manouri manages to transfer Suzanne to another convent, Sainte-Eutrope, liberating her from Sister Sainte-Christine's persecution. At the Sainte-Eutrope convent, the Mother Superior is revealed to be a lesbian and she grows affectionate towards Suzanne. The Mother Superior attempts to seduce Suzanne, but her innocence and chastity eventually drives the Mother Superior into insanity, leading to her death.

Suzanne escapes the Sainte-Eutrope convent using the help of a priest. Following her liberation, she lives in fear of being captured and taken back to the convent as she waits for the help of Marquis de Croismare.

== Themes ==
Diderot was probably, but not certainly, an atheist; he used the novel to attack what he considered to be the corruption of the Catholic Church's institutions, which foster a hierarchical power dynamic between the Mother Superior and the girls, who are forced to take their vows. Diderot depicts the life in the convent as intolerable, dehumanizing and sexually repressive. La Religieuse takes place during a time in France when religious vows were enforced by the government.

== Adaptations ==
La Religieuse has been adapted several times for the cinema, most notably in 1966 as The Nun by Jacques Rivette, starring Anna Karina and Liselotte Pulver, and in 2013 as The Nun starring Pauline Étienne. The novel also inspired Convent of Sinners (1986) by Joe D'Amato.

A theatre adaptation (The Nun) by Julian Forsyth, directed by Margarete Forsyth, was staged at the Greenwich Studio Theatre in 1994.
