= Gottfried Sellius =

German academic and translator

Gottfried Sellius (real name Gottfried Sell) (1704?–1767) was a German academic and translator. He is known for his work on Teredo navalis. and to be one of the three original initiators of an encyclopedia project, which subsequently turned into the Encyclopédie.

== Life ==
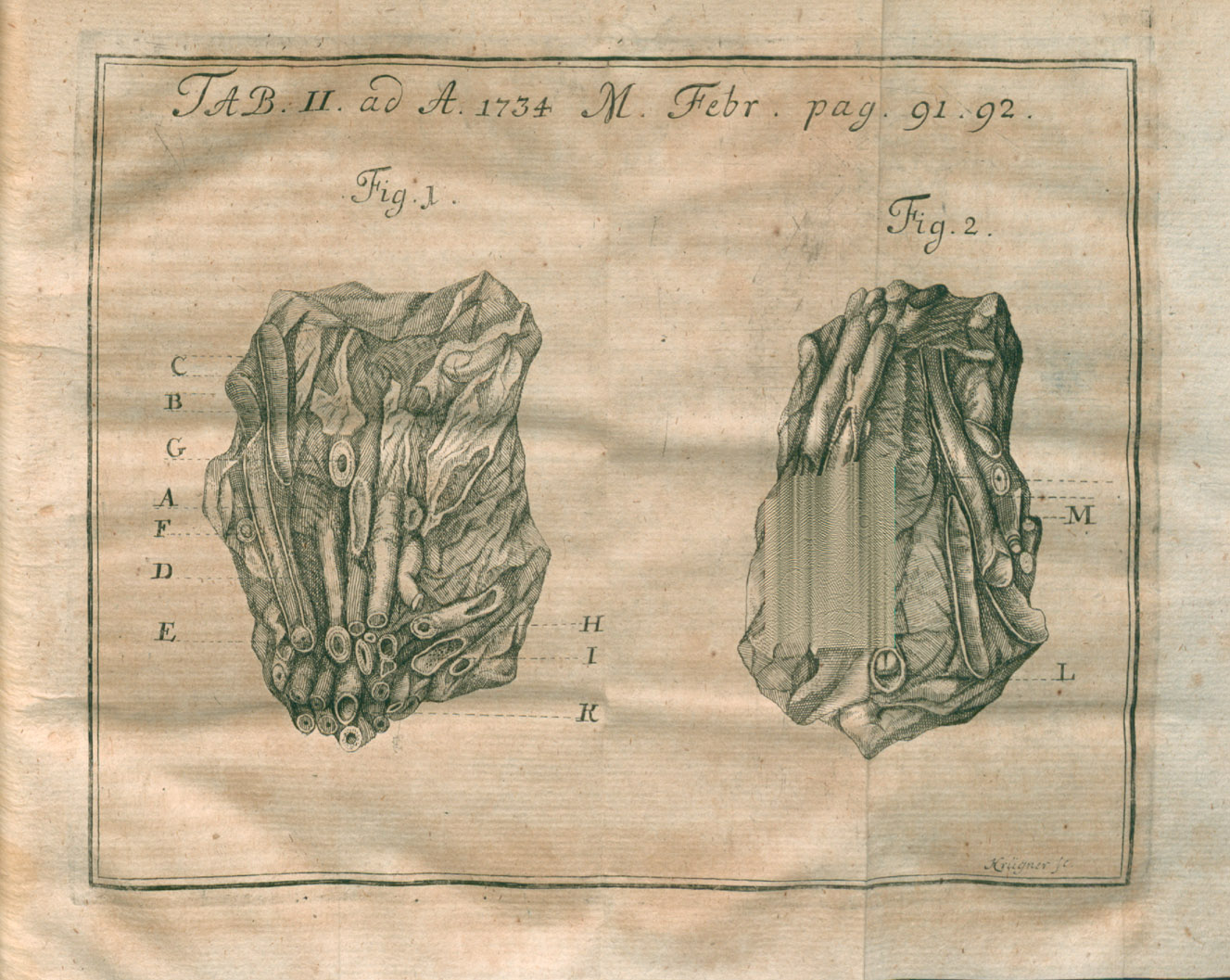
Illustration for the review of Historia naturalis Teredinis seu Xylophagi Marini..., Acta Eruditorum, 1734

He was born in Danzig. He studied at the University of Marburg and then at the University of Leiden, where he took a law degree. He then moved to Utrecht, and married. He became a Fellow of the Royal Society in 1733.

Sellius was appointed to chairs of law, at the University of Göttingen, and at the University of Halle. He taught experimental physics at Halle, but money troubles caused him to move away. A valuable library was auctioned off in 1737.

In Paris Sellius took on translation work, in particular of the Cyclopaedia of Ephraim Chambers. This project came to a brusque end, when the prospective publisher André le Breton rejected the draft translation of Sellius and John Mills, leading to a violent clash and litigation. It did clear the way for the Encyclopédie of Denis Diderot and Jean le Rond d'Alembert, conceived around 1750 as a new adaptation of the work of Chambers, though subsequently taking its own course.

Sellius died in the Charenton Asylum on 25 June 1767.
