= Marc-Antoine-Nicolas de Croismare =

French dilettante (1694–1772)

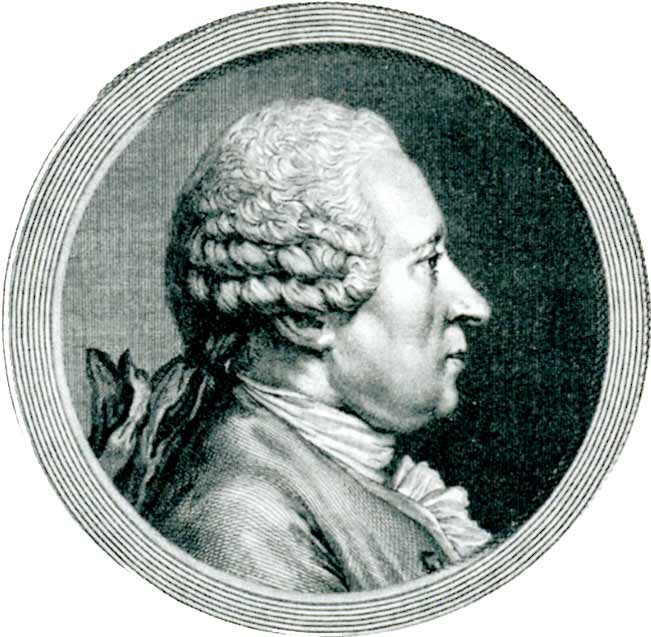
Engraving of the Marquis de Croismare by Halm on a drawing by Cochin the Younger.

Marc-Antoine-Nicolas de Croismare, Marquis of Lasson (1694 in Normandy – 3 August 1772, parish of Saint-Roch in Paris), was a French dilettante, mostly known for having inspired The Nun to Denis Diderot. He also was depicted as "M. le Marquis de Roquemaure" by Italian economist Ferdinando Galiani, in his Dialogues sur les commerce des blés (1770).

Croismare was descended from an old noble family of Normandy, well established at the royal court, the son of François-Nicolas, Lord of Botoirs and La Plesse, and Elizabeth de Croismare, heir to the branch of the lords of La Pinelière and Lasson, a descendant of Nicolas Croixmare. In his youth, the Marquis served as a captain in the infantry regiment of the King, where his brother Louis-Eugene has long been lieutenant-colonel. Uninterested in securing the higher ranks, he left the service after receiving the cross of St. Louis.

The archetype of the amicable Frenchman, the marquis of Croismare earned the nickname "The Philosopher" for giving up ambition early in life. Alternatively, very devout, strong-minded or indifferent, he fell in love with a Protestant girl of his countryside, Suzanne Davy de La Pailleterie. His fervor for the Catholic religion was such that he made Suzanne La Pailleterie his proselyte. Her conversion, effected on 30 October 1734 at Cagny, is perhaps the only one he achieved. After his marriage, on 3 August 1735, she gave him two sons and a daughter. Having lost her early, he nearly died of grief.

After his wife's death, he left his land of Lasson, near Caen, for Paris. Soon after, he was sought after by the best company. He had left his devotion behind in Normandy, and the company of Fontenelle, Mairan, Mirabaud, D'Alembert, Diderot certainly inspired him to keep things this way. In 1759, his business recalled him in Normandy for a few months. Instead, he remained there for nearly eight years. Keen to lure him back to the capital, Diderot and his friends plotted a ruse inspired by the true story of a nun named Marguerite Delamarre who had appealed her vows: they pretended that nun had escaped the convent and was addressing the Marquis to seek his help. The ploy to bring the Marquis back to Paris failed when, instead of returning to Paris, the Marquis offered asylum to the imaginary nun in his home in Normandy. French literature gained one of its most poignant novels. Croismare finally returned to Paris in 1767, having lost none of his gaiety, playfulness and grace, which held true until his death.

== Sources ==
- Friedrich Melchior von Grimm, Correspondance littéraire, philosophique et critique, t. 10, Paris, Éd. Maurice Tourneux, Paris, Garnier Frères, 1879, p. 46-50.
