= Michel-Antoine David =

French printer, publisher and Encyclopédiste

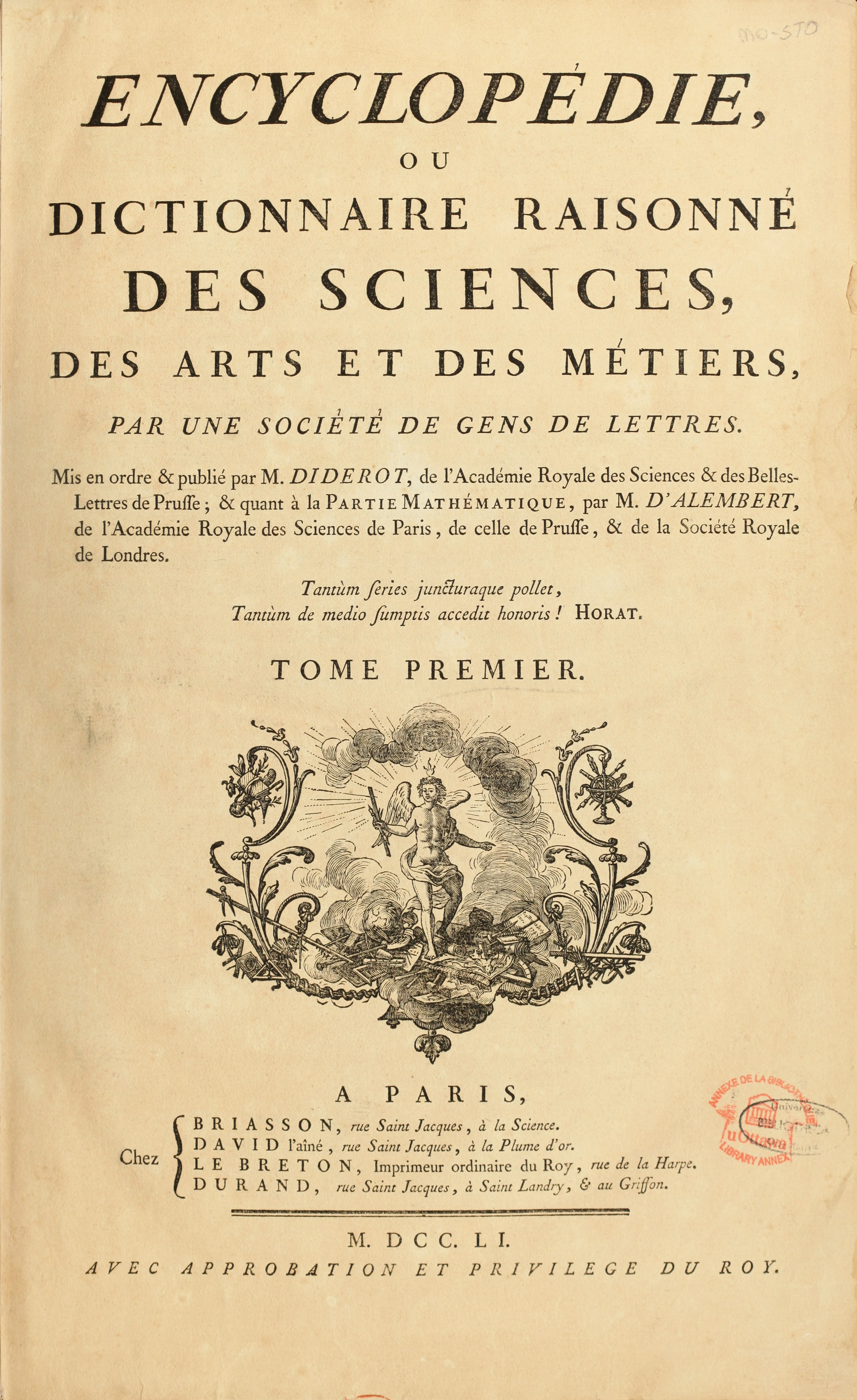
Frontispiece of the first volume of the Encyclopédie published in 1751. Among the printers "David l'aîné, rue Saint-Jacques", à la Plume d'Or (Michel-Antoine David called David l'aîné)

Michel-Antoine David also David l'aîné (1707, ? – 17 March 1769, Paris) was an 18th-century French printer, publisher and Encyclopédiste during the Age of Enlightenment. He was one of the four printers of the Encyclopédie.

== Biography ==
David came from a family of Parisian printers; he was the son of Michel Etienne David. His grandfather was the printer Michel David and his uncle David Christophe (1682–1741). He trained from September 1727 until January 1732 by the Parisian printer Claude-Louis Thiboust. On 2 May 1732, he became a member of the guild of booksellers and printers of Paris and on 1 September 1733 he received his master's certificate.

As a bookseller, he was active in the period from 1732 to 1769 and from 1751 additionally as a publisher. from 1732 to 1769 he lived and worked at various locations in Paris, such as in rue Saint-Jacques (ca. 1751), rue vis-à-vis la grille des Mathurins (ca.1762–1764), rue d'Enfer in the quartier Saint Michel (1765) and finally at Quai des Grands Augustins (ca. 1768).

David was one of the four publishers of the Encyclopédie whose editors were Denis Diderot and Jean le Rond d'Alembert. The other publishers were André le Breton, Antoine-Claude Briasson, and Laurent Durand.

He himself wrote two articles for the Encyclopédie: Catalogue and Droit de copie (see wikisource infra)

== Bibliography ==
- Augustin-Martin Lottin: Catalogue chronologique des libraires et des libraires-imprimeurs de Paris depuis l'an 1470... jusqu'à présent. Paris, 1789, 2 vol.
- Marie-Anne Merland; Jehanne Reyniers: La Fortune d'André-François Lebreton. In Revue française d'histoire du livre. Jan.-März 1979
- Jean-Dominique Mellot; Élisabeth Queval: Répertoire d'imprimeurs/libraires (vers 1500-vers 1810). Paris, Bibliothèque nationale de France, 2004, (p. 170).
- Robert Darnton: The Business of Enlightenment: Publishing History of the Encyclopédie 1775-1800. Harvard University Press 1987, ISBN 0-674-08786-0
- Blom, Philipp: Das vernünftige Ungeheuer. Diderot, D'Alembert, De Jaucourt und die Grosse Enzyklopädie. Eichborn Verlag Frankfurt a/M. 2005, ISBN 3-8218-4553-8, (p. 78), 131
