= Le Fils naturel =

1757 play by Denis Diderot

Le fils naturel
- Original language: French
- Written by: Denis Diderot
- Characters: Dorval; Clairville; Constance; Rosalie; Lysimond; André
- Subject: Family relations
- Genre: Drama
- Setting: Clairville's home

Premiere
- Date: 1757
- Place: France

Le Fils naturel, ou Les épreuves de la vertu (English: The Natural Son) is a 1757 play by Denis Diderot. Diderot followed the play with a treatise on theatre entitled Entretiens sur le fils naturel; this, and Diderot's other publications on theatre, was largely responsible for the play attaining canonical status.

== Background ==
Diderot modeled Le Fils naturel on Carlo Goldoni's Il vero amico, a comedy about two friends who are in love with the same woman, as well as Pierre Corneille's Don Sanche d'Aragon, which shares with Le Fils naturel a sudden twist in the denouement and a similarly named main character. In the third Entretien, Diderot proposed an alternate tragic ending to Le Fils naturel, ending in the protagonist's suicide. It is believed that this was Diderot's original intent for the play, and that because French audiences at the time were resistant to tragic endings, he changed the play's ending to a happier one, concluding with two marriages.

Le Fils naturel was completed in 1757. It is believed that its first staging was in Saint-Germain-en-Laye, at a residence of the Duc d'Ayen, perhaps for a limited, private audience. Later, the play was produced in Baden in 1759, then Hamburg in 1760, then the Paris Comédie-Française on September 26, 1771. This performance was not a success, and even its actors participated reluctantly. Le Fils naturel would not be revived until the 1980s.

The play was translated into Russian in 1788, titled Pobochnyi syn.

== Plot ==
Le Fils naturel tells the story of Dorval, a young man of unknown parentage, who is welcomed into the family of Clairville and his widow sister Constance. Rosalie, Clairville's fiancé, also lives there. Dorval and Rosalie fall in love, and Dorval struggles with his love for Rosalie and his respect for Clairville. When Rosalie's father arrives to bless Clairville and Rosalie's marriage, he acknowledges that Dorval is his illegitimate son. Rosalie and Dorval then realize that the love that they share is familial rather than romantic. Rosalie marries Clairville, and Dorval marries Constance.
