= André le Breton =

French publisher (1708–1779)

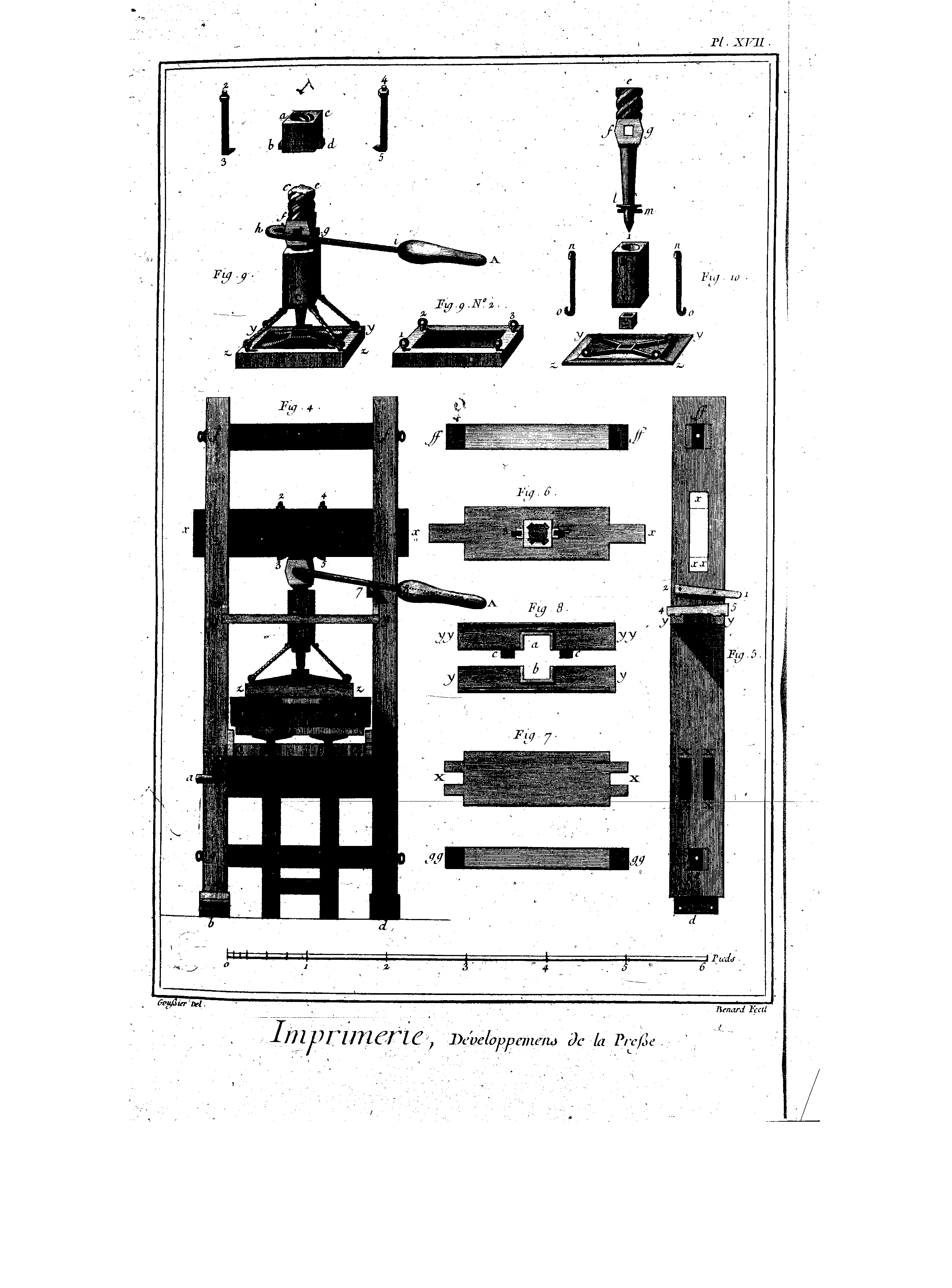
- Born: 2 September 1708; Paris
- Died: 5 October 1779 (aged 71); Paris
- Occupation: Publisher

André François le Breton (2 September 1708 – 5 October 1779) was a French publisher. He was one of the four publishers of the Encyclopédie of Diderot and d'Alembert, along with Michel-Antoine David, Laurent Durand, and Antoine-Claude Briasson. Le Breton contributed some articles to the Encyclopédie (see External links, below), but acted primarily as publisher and editor, often against Diderot's will.

In 1745, le Breton set out to publish a translation of Ephraim Chambers' Cyclopaedia of 1728. He initially chose Jean Paul de Gua de Malves as his editor, but he tired of the job after two years, and in 1747, the editorship went to Diderot. For a more detailed account, see Encyclopédie.

With the assistance of his foreman Louis-Claude Brullé, le Breton would occasionally censor articles in order to make them less radical, frequently drawing the ire of Diderot. For example, le Breton did not included a portion of Diderot's article "Menace" that indirectly attacked Joly de Fleury, the French police commissioner. Le Breton also censored Diderot by changing certain words to distort the meaning of the article. Diderot wrote le Breton a furious letter, in 1764, accusing him of having "massacred" the work and reduced it to a "hodge-podge of insipid clippings". According to Friedrich Melchior Grimm, writing in 1777, "The entire extent of the injury done by this unexampled, murderous, and infamous depredation will never be known, since the perpetrators of the crime burned the manuscript as soon as it was printed and left the evil without remedy." This claim has proved not to be true for, unknown to Grimm, le Breton had kept copies of the page proofs. This collection of final proofs totaled 318 pages. The collection of proofs is known as the "18th volume" of the Enclyopédie.

In the 20th century, these proofs were used to reveal the extent of le Breton's censorship, which was most prominent in the articles "Sarrasins ou Arabes" and "Pyrrhoniene philosophie." In addition, le Breton excluded three of Diderot's articles titled, "Sectes du Christianisme" and "Tolérance" as well as the subarticle "Théologie Scholastique". In the latter case, le Breton edited Diderot's original article to be less favorable towards Pierre Bayle, a 17th-century philosopher whose views were deemed unacceptable. Bayle's views were deemed unacceptable because he was critical of the Church and its use of violence.

== See also ==
- Encyclopédie
- Denis Diderot
- Jean le Rond d'Alembert
