= Sophie Volland =

Louise-Henriette Volland, known as Sophie Volland (1716-1784), was a correspondent and lover of Denis Diderot. None of the letters she wrote have survived.

== Biography ==
Louise-Henriette Volland was born November 27, 1716. She met Diderot in the spring of 1755. Diderot soon gave her the sobriquet of "Sophie", after the Greek word meaning "wisdom", because he valued her insights so much as a friend and a frequent correspondent. Their affair lasted from 1755 until her death in 1784.

Sophie was regularly informed by Diderot about events, artists, and writers of the time. She was a confidante for the philosophe to whom he could talk in detail about his work, his collaborations, and his private affairs. He also trusted her advice and sought consolation from her. She was unmarried and had a difficult relationship with her mother, with whom she had to reside in Isle for six months of every year away from Diderot, though she would have preferred to live in Paris and be near him at all times. The frequent letters that Diderot sent to Sophie give indications about his private life, his knowledge, and his thoughts on politics, art, art critics, and the intellectuals of his era. This correspondence is considered an important part of his work. As Diderot had to rely on a range of unreliable means to get his letters to her, he numbered them to ensure they could be read and understood in order. Only 187 out of 553 letters that Diderot wrote to Sophie are now extant.

None of Sophie's letters to Diderot have ever been found and no portrait of Sophie has survived. The only concrete details known about her are that she wore glasses, was often in poor health, and had la menotte sèche (small, dry hands) but that she was apparently very intellectually curious and capable, studying both science and philosophy, for which Diderot admired her very much. She died on February 22, 1784, and Diderot only survived her by five months.

== See also ==
- Mélanie de Salignac
