= Didier Diderot =

French craftsman

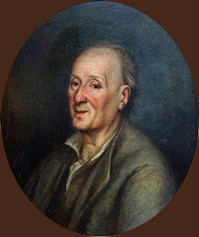
Didier Diderot (1685–1759), a painting by an unknown artist. Musée d'art et d'histoire de Langres

Didier Diderot (14 September 1685 in Langres – 3 June 1759 ibid) was a French craftsman and the father of the encyclopedist, author, and philosopher of the Enlightenment Denis Diderot.

== Biography ==
Didier Diderot descended from families of local craftsmen from the city of Langres, Champagne. His father, Denis Diderot (1654–1726), senior, was a master craftsman, or rather a knife forgemaster, maître coutelier, and his mother was Nicole Beligné (1655–1692). On 20 June 1679 both had married. Nicole Beligné was born on 1655 as the daughter of a wealthy artisan family. Her father was François Beligné (1625–1697) who was also knife blacksmith, her mother was Catherine Grassot. From his father-in-law Beligné Denis Diderot adopted the labeling of their own products: a pearl, la perle. Didier (compare also Desiderius of Langres) had five brothers - Didier was the second son - and one sister; by order of birth year, the Diderot children are as follows: Antoine Thomas (1682–1755); Didier (1685-1769); Claude (1687–1689); François (born 1688); Felix (born 1689); Catherine Diderot (born 1690).

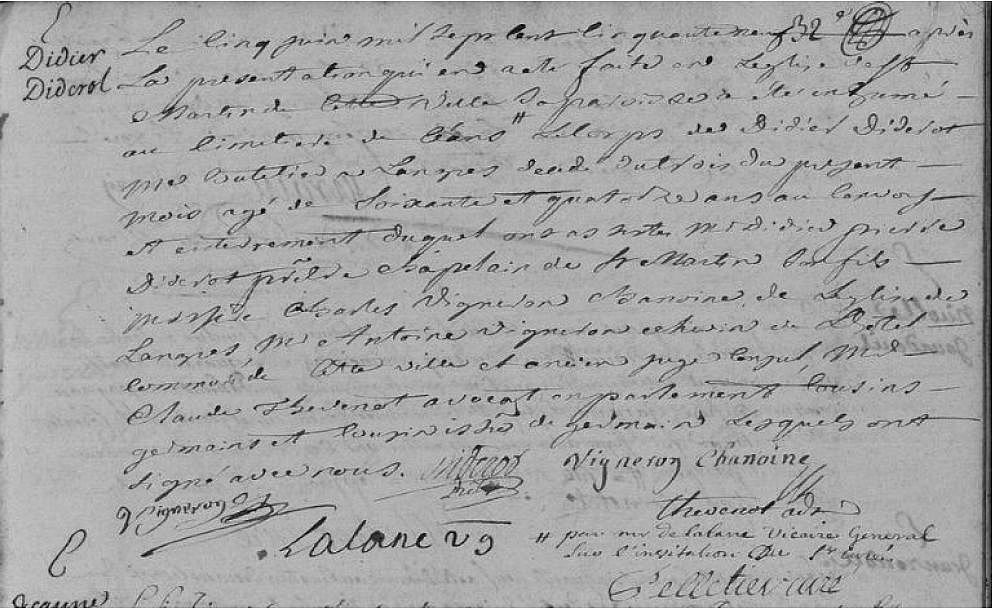
Death deed of Didier Diderot, acte de décès

Didier Diderot married on 19 January 1712 in Chassigny Angélique Vigneron (12 October 1677 – 1 October 1748). She was the daughter of the tanner, tanneur François Vigneron (died in 1679) and Jeanne Aramite Humblot (died in 1710) from Langres. Didier Diderot was close to the Jansenism. Later they had three sons and four daughters, one son died shortly after his birth in 1712, followed by Denis (1713–1784) and Didier-Pierre (1722–1787), the canon of Langres, Langres chanoine écrivain (see also Roman Catholic Diocese of Langres) and the sisters Denise (1715–1797), Catherine (1716–1718), Catherine (born 1719) and Angélique Diderot (born 1720). Angélique Diderot joined the Ursulines.

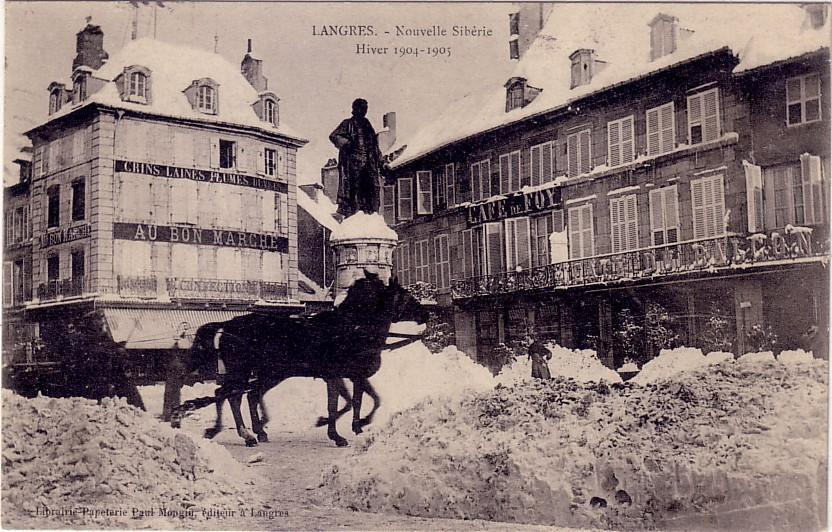
n° 9 de la place dans le centre ville de Langres in the background on the right side the birthplace of Denis Diderot

The family lived around the year 1713 in the center of Langres, Place Chambeau today the n ° 9 de la place dans le center ville de Langres, a place that now bears the name of Denis Diderot.

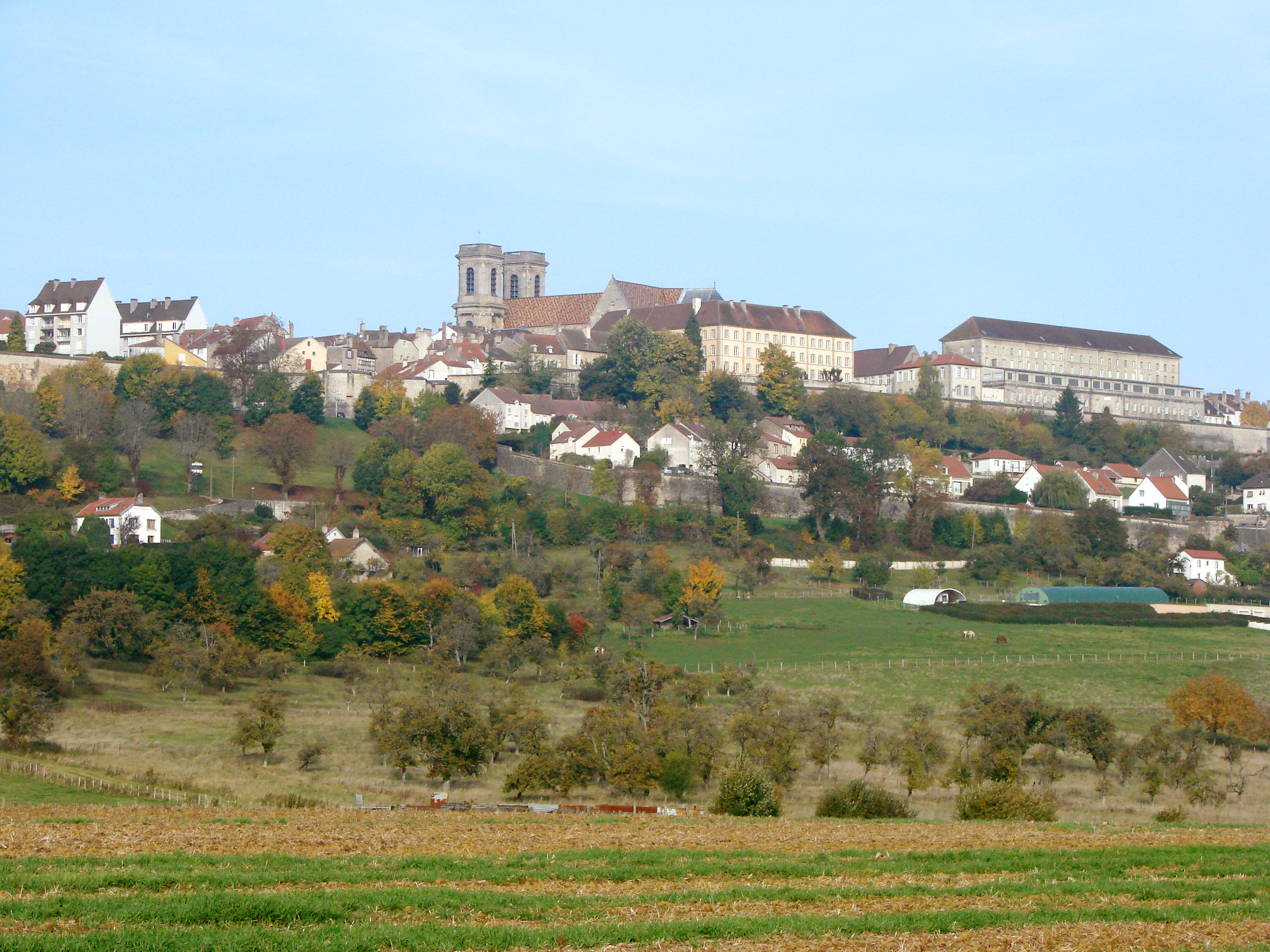
Contemporary view of Langres (Haute-Marne)

Didier Diderot was a specialist in the manufacture of medical and surgical cutting instruments, and his lancets were sought after by teaching doctors.

== Selected writing ==
- Diderot, Didier; Marcel, Louis: Une lettre du père de Diderot à son fils, détenu à Vincennes (3 septembre 1749). J. Bière, Bordeaux, (1928)
