= Philosophical Thoughts =

1746 book by Denis Diderot

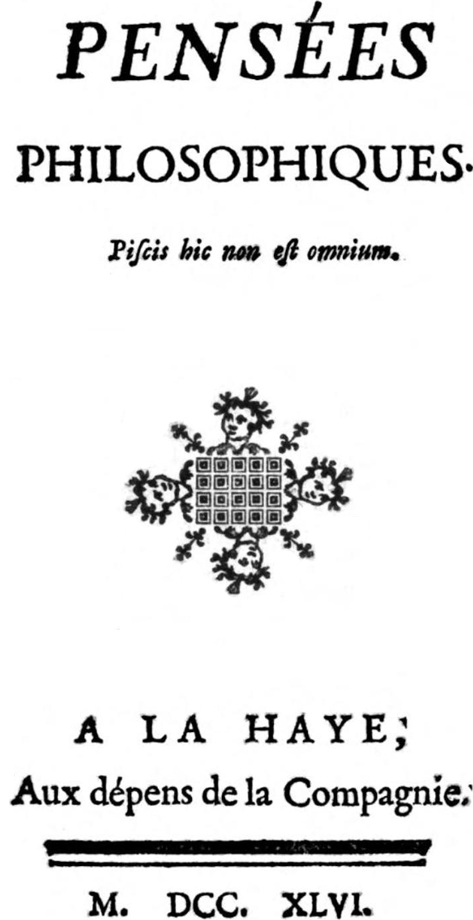
Princeps edition

Philosophical Thoughts (French: Pensées philosophiques) is a 1746 book composed by Denis Diderot; it was his first original work.

In the book, Diderot argued that both reason and feeling (emotion) were required to establish harmony. He defended deism and criticized both atheism and Christianity. He expressed his contempt for theologians, and criticized all forms of self-torture (self-harm).

== Content ==
In this book, Diderot argued for a reconciliation of reason with feeling so as to establish harmony. According to Diderot, without feeling there would be a detrimental effect on virtue and no possibility of creating any sublime work. However, since feeling without discipline can be destructive, reason was necessary to rein in feeling. (Note: Diderot writes in his book: We are constantly railing against the passions; to them we ascribe all of man's afflictions while forgetting that they are the source of all pleasures...But what provokes me is that only their adverse side is considered...And yet only passions and great passions can raise the soul to great things. Without them the sublime no longer exists either in morals or in creativity.)

At the time Diderot wrote this book he was a deist. Hence there is a defense of deism in this book, and some arguments against atheism. The book also contains criticism of any kind of self-torture, including self-flagellation. For the 1770 edition of the work, Diderot included some additional material which contained even greater heresies; this included explicit criticism of Christianity, (Note: Diderot writes in his book: The Christian God is a father who prizes his apples but sets little value on his children.) and contempt for theologians.

A suburb resounds with outcries: the ashes of one of the elect perform more prodigies there than Jesus Christ performed in the whole of his life. People run, or are carried to the spot, and I follow the crowd. I have no sooner arrived than I hear people exclaiming "Miracle!" I approach, I look, and I see a little lame boy walking with the help of three or four charitable onlookers; and the crowd, awe-struck, cry "Miracle!Miracle!" Where is the miracle, then, you fools? Cannot you see that the rogue has done no more than change one pair of crutches for another?...Would a God full of goodwill find pleasure in bathing in tears? Would such terrors not be a reflection on his clemency? If criminals had to appease the fury of a tyrant, what more could be expected of them than this?

— Diderot, in Philosophical Thoughts

People begin to speak to us of God too soon, and another mistake is that his presence is not sufficiently insisted upon. Men have banished God from their company and have hidden him in a sanctuary; the walls of a temple shut him in, he has no existence beyond. Fools that you are, break down these limitations that hamper your ideas; set God free; see him everywhere, as he is everywhere, or say that he is non-existent. If I had a child to bring up, I would make his God his companion in such a real sense that he would perhaps find it less difficult to become an atheist, than to escape his presence. Instead of confronting him with a fellow-man (whom maybe he knows to be worse than himself) I would say outright: "God hears you and you are lying." Young people are influenced by their senses. I would multiply about him symbols indicating the divine presence. If there were a gathering at my house, I would leave a place for God, and I would accustom him to say: "We were four-God, my friend, my tutor, and myself."

== Reception ==
In July 1746, the Parlement of Paris condemned the book (Note: According to the Parlement of Paris, the book was presenting to restless and reckless spirits the venom of the most criminal opinions that the depravity of human reason is capable of.) and ordered it to be burned in public. (Note: The public executioner burned some papers in lieu of the book which the authorities were unable to procure) This enhanced the book's popularity. Since the book was very well written, and since Diderot preferred not to reveal himself as its author, it was thought by both Diderot's friends and enemies that the work was of some established author like Voltaire, La Mettrie, or Condillac.
