= Mme de Maux =

Jeanne-Catherine de Maux (16 Dec 1725–11 May 1812), better known as Mme de Maux (Madame de Maux), was born in Paris on 16 December 1725, a natural daughter of Quinault-Dufresne. In 1737, at the age of twelve, she married a lawyer in Paris. She later became a lover of Denis Diderot's friend Damilaville. Some time after Damilaville's death, in 1768, she became the lover of Diderot, but later left him for a younger man. (Note: Although the romantic relationship came to an end, Diderot and Mme de Maux continued to remain friends.)

She is considered significant because many letters written by Diderot to her, containing scientific, philosophical, and romantic content, have survived. Diderot began writing Sur les femmes soon after his romantic relationship with Mme de Maux had ended. It has been stated that his romantic dalliance with Mme de Maux resulted in Diderot producing some of his best writings on love, sex, and sexuality.

Mme de Maux is known to have been a friend of Mme d'Épinay.

She died in Paris on 11 May 1812.
