= Letter on the Blind =

Book by Denis Diderot

Letter on the Blind, for the Usage of Those Who Can See
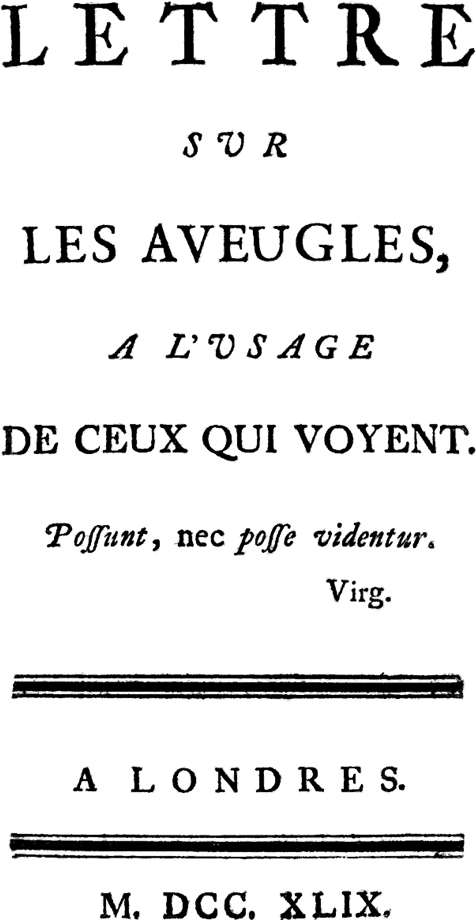
- Title Page, First Edition, 1749
- Author: Denis Diderot
- Original title: Lettre sur les aveugles à l'usage de ceux qui voient
- Language: French
- Publication date: 1749
- Publication place: France

In Letter on the Blind for the Use of those who can see (French: Lettre sur les aveugles à l'usage de ceux qui voient, 1749), Denis Diderot takes on the question of visual perception, a subject that, at the time, experienced a resurgence of interest due to the success of medical procedures that allowed surgeons to operate on cataracts (demonstrated in 1728 by William Cheselden and 1747 by Jacques Daviel) and certain cases of blindness from birth. Speculations were then numerous upon what the nature and use of vision was, and how much perception, habit, and experience allow individuals to identify forms in space, to perceive distances and to measure volumes, or to distinguish a realistic work of art from reality.

According to Diderot's essay, a blind person who is suddenly able to see for the first time does not immediately understand what he sees, and he must spend some amount of time establishing rapports between his experience of forms and distances (understandings that he first acquired by touch) and the images that were thereafter apparent to him by sight.

== Religion ==
In the work Diderot revealed his atheist stance, which was revolutionary at the time. He was imprisoned for that, but protection of people associated with the Encyclopédie led to his liberation after a few months.
