= Denis Diderot =

French philosopher and writer (1713–1784)

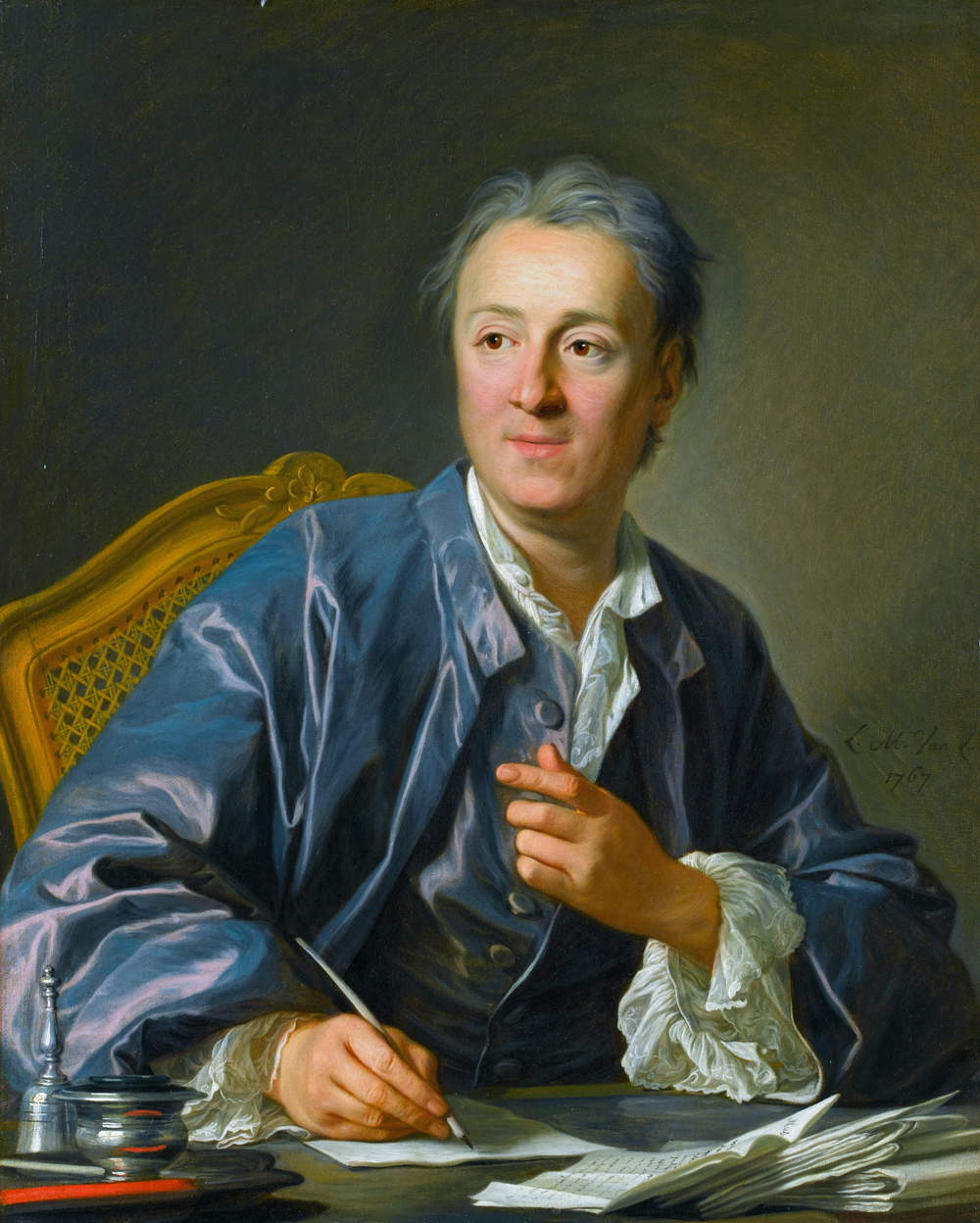
- Portrait of Denis Diderot by Louis-Michel van Loo, 1767
- Born: 5 October 1713; Langres, Champagne, France
- Died: 31 July 1784 (aged 70); Paris, France
- Spouse: Antoinette Champion (m. 1743)
- Children: 4

Education
- Education: University of Paris

Philosophical work
- Era: 18th-century philosophy
- Region: Western philosophy
- School: Encyclopédistes; French materialism
- Main interests: Science, literature, philosophy, art

Denis Diderot (/ˈdiːdəroʊ/; French: [dəni did(ə)ʁo]; 5 October 1713 – 31 July 1784) was a French philosopher, art critic, and writer, best known for serving as co-founder, chief editor, and contributor to the Encyclopédie along with Jean le Rond d'Alembert. He was a prominent figure during the Age of Enlightenment.

Diderot studied philosophy at a Jesuit college, then considered working in the church clergy before briefly studying law. When he decided to become a writer in 1734, his father disowned him. He lived a bohemian existence for the next decade. In the 1740s he wrote many of his best-known works in fiction and non-fiction, including the 1748 novel Les Bijoux indiscrets (The Indiscreet Jewels).

In 1751 Diderot co-created the Encyclopédie with Jean le Rond d'Alembert. It was the first encyclopedia to include contributions from many named contributors and the first to describe the mechanical arts. Its secular tone, which included articles skeptical about Biblical miracles, angered both religious and government authorities; in 1758 it was banned by the Catholic Church and, in 1759, the French government banned it as well, although this ban was not strictly enforced. Many of the initial contributors to the Encyclopédie left the project as a result of its controversies and some were even jailed. D'Alembert left in 1759, making Diderot the sole editor. Diderot also became the main contributor, writing around 7,000 articles. He continued working on the project until 1765. He was increasingly despondent about the Encyclopédie by the end of his involvement in it and felt that the entire project might have been a waste. Nevertheless, the Encyclopédie is considered one of the forerunners of the French Revolution.

Diderot struggled financially throughout most of his career and received very little official recognition of his merit, including being passed over for membership in the Académie Française. His fortunes improved significantly in 1766, when Russian Empress Catherine the Great, who had heard of his financial troubles, bought his 3,000-volume personal library, amassed during his work on the Encyclopédie, for 15,000 livres, and offered him in addition a thousand more livres per year to serve as its custodian while he lived. He received 50 years' "salary" up front from her, and stayed five months at her court in Saint Petersburg in 1773 and 1774, sharing discussions and writing essays on various topics for her several times a week.

Diderot's literary reputation during his life rested primarily on his plays and his contributions to the Encyclopédie; many of his most important works, including Jacques the Fatalist, Rameau's Nephew, Paradox of the Actor, and D'Alembert's Dream, were published only after his death.

== Early life ==
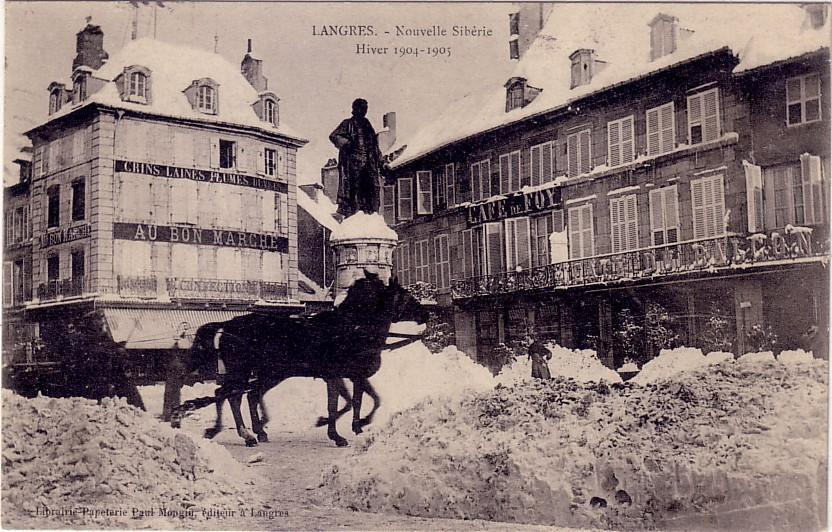
N° 9 de la place dans le centre ville de Langres: in the background on the right side is Diderot's birthplace

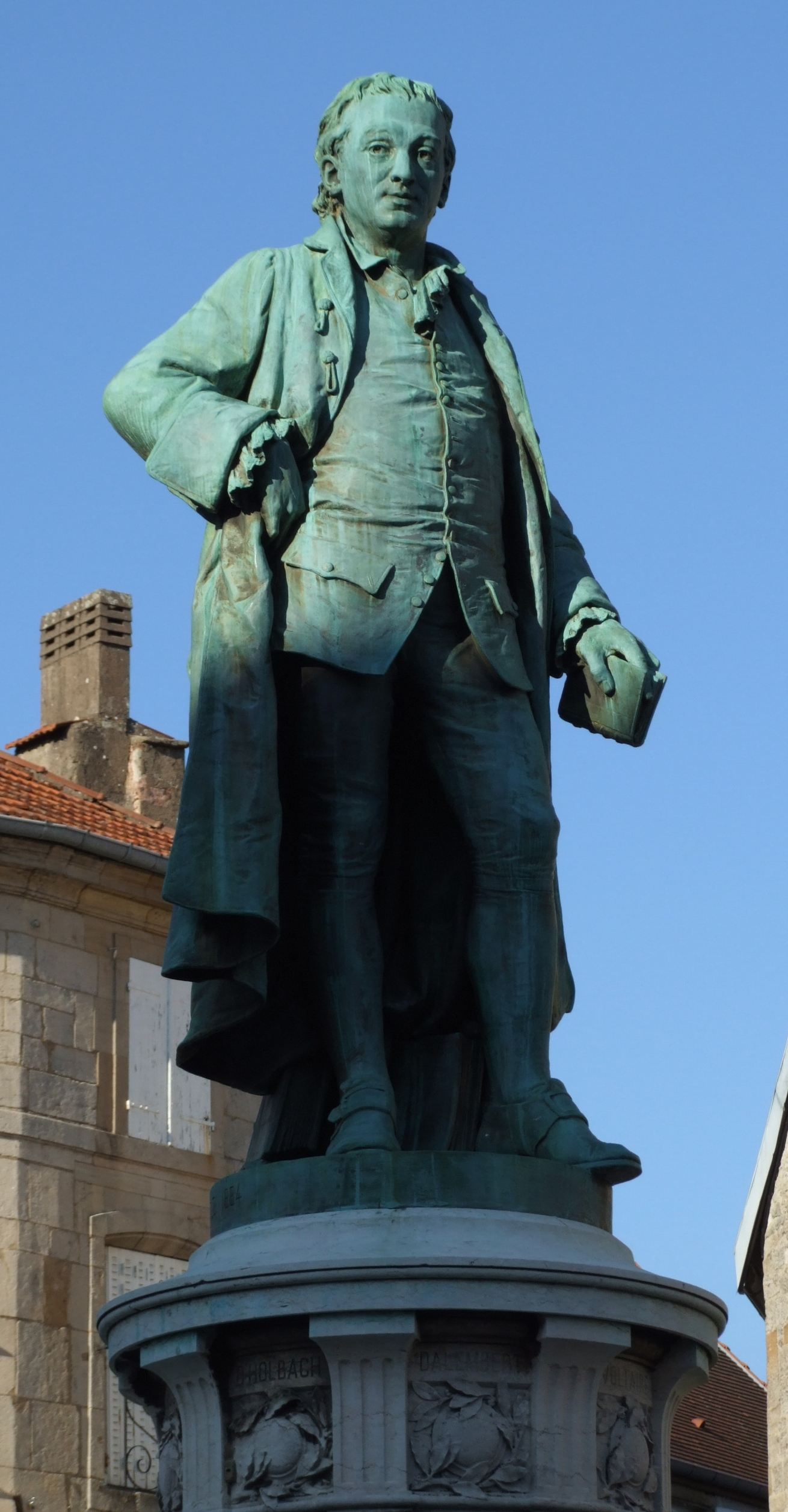
Statue of Denis Diderot in the city of Langres, his birthplace

Denis Diderot was born in Langres, Champagne. His parents were Didier Diderot, a cutler, maître coutelier, and Angélique Vigneron. Of Denis' five siblings, three survived to adulthood: Denise Diderot, their youngest brother Pierre-Didier Diderot and, their sister Angélique Diderot. Denis Diderot greatly admired his sister Denise, sometimes referring to her as "a female Socrates".

Diderot began his formal education at a Jesuit college in Langres. In 1732 he received the degree of Master of Arts from the University of Paris. He abandoned the idea of entering the clergy in 1735 and, instead, decided to study at the Paris Law Faculty. His study of law was short-lived and in the early 1740s he decided to become a writer and translator. Because of his refusal to enter one of the learned professions, he was disowned by his father and, for the next ten years, he lived a bohemian existence.

In 1742 he formed a friendship with Jean-Jacques Rousseau, whom he met while watching games of chess and drinking coffee at the Café de la Régence. In October 1743, he further alienated his father by marrying Antoinette Champion (1710–1796), a devout Catholic. Diderot senior considered the match inappropriate, given Champion's low social standing, poor education, fatherless status, and lack of a dowry. She was about three years older than Diderot. She bore Diderot one surviving child, a girl, named Angélique, after both Diderot's dead mother and his sister. The death in 1749 of his sister Angélique, a nun, in her convent, may have affected Diderot's opinion of religion. She is assumed to have been the inspiration for his novel about a nun, La Religieuse, in which he depicts a woman who is forced to enter a convent, where she suffers at the hands of her fellow nuns.

Diderot was unfaithful to his wife, and had affairs with Anne-Gabrielle Babuty (who would marry and later divorce the artist Jean-Baptiste Greuze), Madeleine de Puisieux, Sophie Volland, and Mme de Maux (Jeanne-Catherine de Maux), to whom he wrote numerous surviving letters and who eventually left him for a younger man. Diderot's letters to Sophie Volland are known for their candor and are regarded to be "among the literary treasures of the eighteenth century".

== Early works ==
Diderot's earliest works included a translation of Temple Stanyan's History of Greece (1743). In 1745, he published a translation of Shaftesbury's Inquiry Concerning Virtue and Merit, to which he had added his own "reflections". With two colleagues, François-Vincent Toussaint and Marc-Antoine Eidous, he produced a translation of Robert James's Medicinal Dictionary (1746–1748).

=== Philosophical Thoughts ===
In 1746, Diderot wrote his first original work: the Philosophical Thoughts (Pensées philosophiques). In this book, Diderot argued for a reconciliation of reason with feeling so as to establish harmony. According to Diderot, without feeling there is a detrimental effect on virtue, and no possibility of creating sublime work. However, since feeling without discipline can be destructive, reason is necessary to control feeling.

At the time Diderot wrote this book he was a deist. Hence there is a defense of deism in this book, and some arguments against atheism. The book also contains criticism of Christianity.

=== The Skeptic's Walk ===
In 1747, Diderot wrote The Skeptic's Walk (Promenade du sceptique) in which a deist, an atheist, and a pantheist have a dialogue on the nature of divinity. The deist gives the argument from design. The atheist says that the universe is better explained by physics, chemistry, matter, and motion. The pantheist says that the cosmic unity of mind and matter, which are co-eternal and comprise the universe, is God. This work remained unpublished until 1830. Accounts differ as to why. It was either because the local police, warned by the priests of another attack on Christianity, seized the manuscript, or because the authorities forced Diderot to give an undertaking that he would not publish this work.

=== The Indiscreet Jewels ===
In 1748, Diderot needed to raise money on short notice. His wife had given him a child, and his mistress Madeleine de Puisieux was making financial demands of him. According to his Daughter's (uncorroborated) Mémoires pour servir â l'histoire de la vie et des ouvrages de Diderot, at this time, Diderot told his mistress that writing a novel was a trivial task, whereupon she challenged him to write one, and so Diderot produced The Indiscreet Jewels (Les bijoux indiscrets).

The book about the magical ring of a Sultan that induces any woman's "discreet jewels" (Note: Bijou is a slang word meaning the vagina.) to confess their sexual experiences when the ring is pointed at them. In all, the ring is pointed at thirty different women in the book—usually at a dinner or a social meeting—with the Sultan typically being visible to the woman. However, since the ring has the additional property of making its owner invisible when required, a few of the sexual experiences recounted are through direct observation with the Sultan making himself invisible and placing his person in the unsuspecting woman's boudoir.

Besides the bawdiness, there are several digressions into philosophy, music, and literature in the book. In one such philosophical digression, the Sultan has a dream in which he sees a child named "Experiment" growing bigger and stronger till the child demolishes an ancient temple named "Hypothesis". The book proved to be lucrative for Diderot even though it could only be sold clandestinely. It is Diderot's most published work.

The book is believed to draw upon the 1742 libertine novel Le Sopha by Claude Prosper Jolyot de Crébillon (Crébillon fils).

=== Scientific work ===
Diderot kept writing on science in a desultory way all his life. The scientific work of which he was most proud was Memoires sur differents sujets de mathematique (1748). This work contains original ideas on acoustics, tension, air resistance, and "a project for a new organ" that could be played by all. Some of Diderot's scientific works were applauded by contemporary publications of his time such as The Gentleman's Magazine, the Journal des savants; and the Jesuit publication Journal de Trevoux, which invited more such work: "on the part of a man as clever and able as M. Diderot seems to be, of whom we should also observe that his style is as elegant, trenchant, and unaffected as it is lively and ingenious."

On the unity of nature Diderot wrote, "Without the idea of the whole, philosophy is no more," and, "Everything changes; everything passes; nothing remains but the whole." He wrote of the temporal nature of molecules, and rejected emboîtement, the view that organisms are pre-formed in an infinite regression of non-changing germs. He saw minerals and species as part of a spectrum, and he was fascinated with hermaphroditism. His answer to the universal attraction in corpuscular physics models was universal elasticity. His view of nature's flexibility foreshadows the discovery of evolution, but it is not Darwinistic in a strict sense.

=== Letter on the Blind ===
Diderot's celebrated Letter on the Blind (Lettre sur les aveugles à l'usage de ceux qui voient) (1749) introduced him to the world as an original thinker. The subject is a discussion of the relation between reasoning and the knowledge acquired through perception (the five senses). The title of his book also evoked some ironic doubt about who exactly were "the blind" under discussion. In the essay, blind English mathematician Nicholas Saunderson argues that, since knowledge derives from the senses, mathematics is the only form of knowledge that both he and a sighted person can agree on. It is suggested that the blind could be taught to read through their sense of touch. (A later essay, Lettre sur les sourds et muets, considered the case of a similar deprivation in the deaf and mute.) According to Jonathan Israel, what makes the Lettre sur les aveugles so remarkable, however, is its distinct, if undeveloped, presentation of the theory of variation and natural selection.

This powerful essay, for which La Mettrie expressed warm appreciation in 1751, revolves around a remarkable deathbed scene in which a dying blind philosopher, Saunderson, rejects the arguments of a deist clergyman who endeavours to win him around to a belief in a providential God during his last hours. Saunderson's arguments are those of a neo-Spinozist Naturalist and fatalist, using a sophisticated notion of the self-generation and natural evolution of species without creation or supernatural intervention. The notion of "thinking matter" is upheld and the "argument from design" discarded (following La Mettrie) as hollow and unconvincing. The work appeared anonymously in Paris in June 1749, and was vigorously suppressed by the authorities. Diderot, who had been under police surveillance since 1747, was swiftly identified as the author, had his manuscripts confiscated, and he was imprisoned for some months, under a lettre de cachet, on the outskirts of Paris, in the dungeons at Vincennes where he was visited almost daily by Rousseau, at the time his closest and most assiduous ally.

Voltaire wrote an enthusiastic letter to Diderot commending the Lettre and stating that he had held Diderot in high regard for a long time, to which Diderot sent a warm response. Soon after this, Diderot was arrested.

Science historian Conway Zirkle has written that Diderot was an early evolutionary thinker and noted that his passage that described natural selection was "so clear and accurate that it almost seems that we would be forced to accept his conclusions as a logical necessity even in the absence of the evidence collected since his time."

== Incarceration and release ==
Angered by public resentment over the Peace of Aix-la-Chapelle, the government started incarcerating many of its critics. It was decided at this time to rein in Diderot. On 23 July 1749, the governor of the Vincennes fortress instructed the police to incarcerate Diderot, and the next day he was arrested and placed in solitary confinement at Vincennes. It was at this period that Rousseau visited Diderot in prison and came out a changed man, with newfound ideas about the disadvantages of knowledge, civilization, and Enlightenment – the so-called illumination de Vincennes.

Diderot had been permitted to retain one book that he had in his possession at the time of his arrest, Paradise Lost, which he read during his incarceration. He wrote notes and annotations on the book, using a toothpick as a pen, and ink that he made by scraping slate from the walls and mixing it with wine.

In August 1749, Mme du Chatelet, presumably at Voltaire's behest, wrote to the governor of Vincennes, who was her relative, pleading for Diderot to be lodged more comfortably during his incarceration. The governor then offered Diderot access to the great halls of the Vincennes castle and the freedom to receive books and visitors providing he wrote a document of submission. On 13 August 1749, Diderot wrote to the governor:

I admit to you ... that the Pensées, the Bijoux, and the Lettre sur les aveugles are debaucheries of the mind that escaped from me; but I can ... promise you on my honor (and I do have honor) that they will be the last, and that they are the only ones ... As for those who have taken part in the publication of these works, nothing will be hidden from you. I shall depose verbally, in the depths [secrecy] of your heart, the names both of the publishers and the printers.

On 20 August, Diderot was moved to a comfortable room in the fortress and allowed to meet visitors and walk within the gardens. On 23 August, Diderot signed another letter promising never to leave the prison without permission. On 3 November 1749, he was given his freedom. Subsequently, in 1750, he released the prospectus for the Encyclopédie.

== Encyclopédie ==
=== Genesis ===
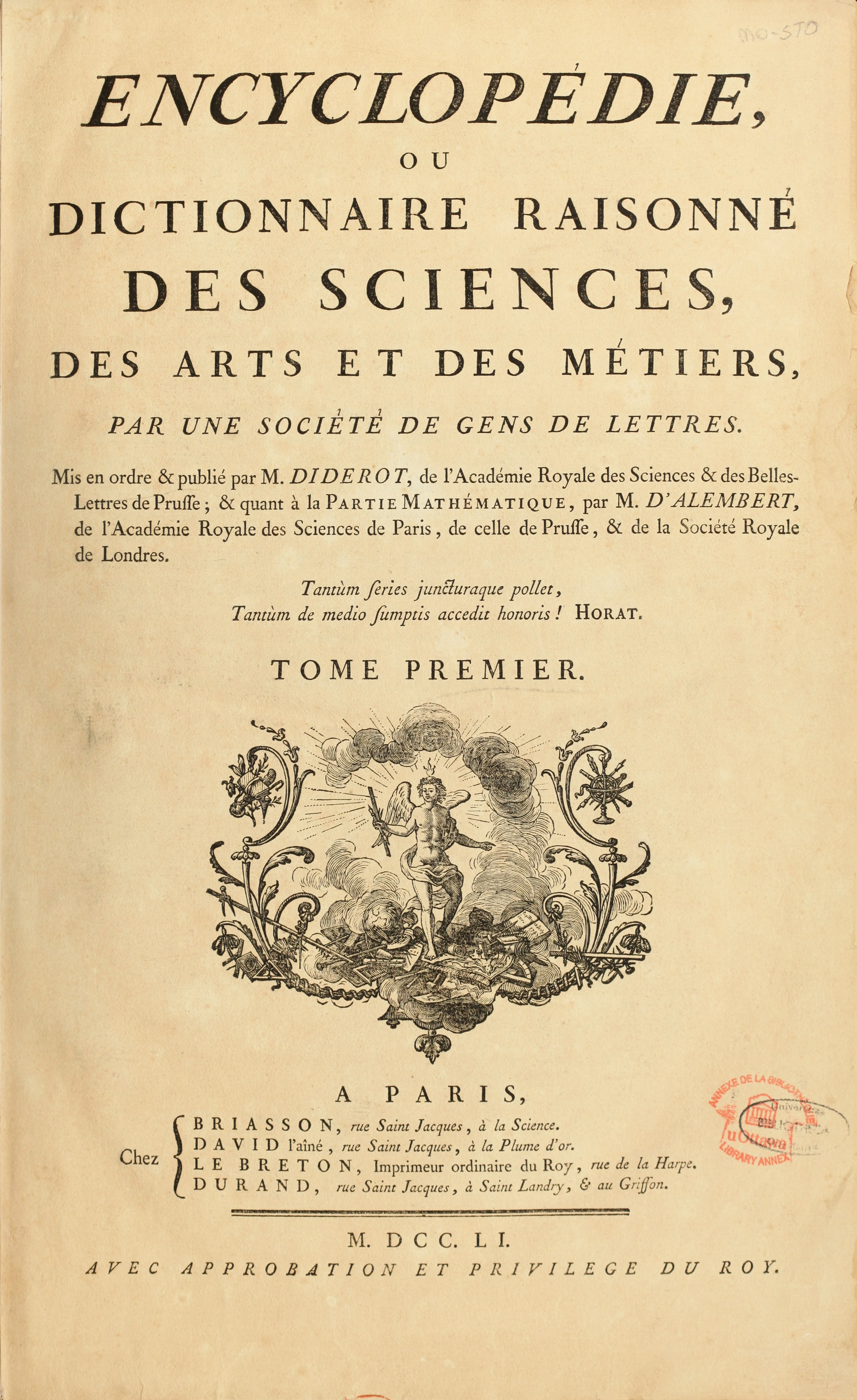
Title page of the Encyclopédie

André le Breton, a bookseller and printer, approached Diderot with a project for the publication of a translation of Ephraim Chambers' Cyclopaedia, or Universal Dictionary of Arts and Sciences into French, first undertaken by the Englishman John Mills, and followed by the German Gottfried Sellius. Diderot accepted the proposal, and transformed it. He persuaded Le Breton to publish a new work, which would consolidate ideas and knowledge from the Republic of Letters. The publishers found capital for a larger enterprise than they had first planned. Jean le Rond d'Alembert was persuaded to become Diderot's colleague, and permission was procured from the government.

In 1750, an elaborate prospectus announced the project, and the first volume was published in 1751. This work was unorthodox and advanced for the time. Diderot stated that "An encyclopedia ought to make good the failure to execute such a project hitherto, and should encompass not only the fields already covered by the academies, but each and every branch of human knowledge." Comprehensive knowledge will give "the power to change men's common way of thinking." The seminal work combined scholarship with information on trades. Diderot emphasized the abundance of knowledge within each subject area. Everyone would benefit from these insights.

=== Controversies ===
Diderot's work, however, was mired in controversy from the beginning; the project was suspended by the courts in 1752. Just as the second volume was completed, accusations arose regarding seditious content, concerning the editor's entries on religion and natural law. Diderot was detained and his house was searched for manuscripts for subsequent articles: but the search proved fruitless as no manuscripts could be found. They had been hidden in the house of an unlikely confederate—Chretien de Lamoignon Malesherbes, who originally ordered the search. Although Malesherbes was a staunch absolutist, and loyal to the monarchy—he was sympathetic to the literary project. Along with his support, and that of other well-placed influential confederates, the project resumed. Diderot returned to his efforts only to be constantly embroiled in controversy.

These twenty years were to Diderot not merely a time of incessant drudgery, but harassing persecution and desertion of friends. The ecclesiastical party detested the Encyclopédie, in which they saw a rising stronghold for their philosophic enemies. By 1757, they could endure it no longer—the subscribers had grown from 2,000 to 4,000, a measure of the growth of the work in popular influence and power. Diderot wanted the Encyclopédie to give all the knowledge of the world to the people of France. The Encyclopédie threatened the governing social classes of France (aristocracy) because it took for granted the justice of religious tolerance, freedom of thought, and the value of science and industry. It asserted the doctrine that the main concern of the nation's government ought to be the nation's common people. It was believed that the Encyclopédie was the work of an organized band of conspirators against society, and that the dangerous ideas they held were made truly formidable by their open publication. In 1759, the Encyclopédie was formally suppressed. The decree did not stop the work, which went on, but its difficulties increased by the necessity of being clandestine. Jean le Rond d'Alembert withdrew from the enterprise and other powerful colleagues, including Anne Robert Jacques Turgot, Baron de Laune, declined to contribute further to a book that had acquired a bad reputation.

=== Diderot's contribution ===
Diderot was left to finish the task as best he could. He wrote approximately 7,000 articles, some very slight, but many of them laborious, comprehensive, and long. He damaged his eyesight correcting proofs and editing the manuscripts of less scrupulous contributors. He spent his days at workshops, mastering manufacturing processes, and his nights writing what he had learned during the day. He was incessantly harassed by threats of police raids. The last copies of the first volume were issued in 1765.

In 1764, when his immense work was drawing to an end, he encountered a crowning mortification: he discovered that the bookseller, Le Breton, fearing the government's displeasure, had struck out from the proof sheets, after they had left Diderot's hands, all passages that he considered too dangerous. "He and his printing-house overseer", writes Furbank, "had worked in complete secrecy, and had moreover deliberately destroyed the author's original manuscript so that the damage could not be repaired." The monument to which Diderot had given the labor of twenty long and oppressive years was irreparably mutilated and defaced. It was 12 years, in 1772, before the subscribers received the final 28 folio volumes of the Encyclopédie, ou dictionnaire raisonné des sciences, des arts et des métiers since the first volume had been published.

When Diderot's work on the Encyclopédie project came to an end in 1765, he expressed concerns to his friends that the twenty-five years he had spent on the project had been wasted.

== Mature works ==
Although the Encyclopédie was Diderot's most monumental product, he was the author of many other works that sowed nearly every intellectual field with new and creative ideas. Diderot's writing ranges from a graceful trifle like the Regrets sur ma vieille robe de chambre (Regrets for my Old Dressing Gown) up to the heady D'Alembert's Dream (Le Rêve de d'Alembert) (composed 1769), a philosophical dialogue in which he plunges into the depths of the controversy as to the ultimate constitution of matter and the meaning of life. Jacques le fataliste (written between 1765 and 1780, but not published until 1792 in German and 1796 in French) is similar to Tristram Shandy and The Sentimental Journey in its challenge to the conventional novel's structure and content.

=== La Religieuse (The Nun or Memoirs of a Nun) ===
La Religieuse was a novel that claimed to show the corruption of the Catholic Church's institutions.

==== Plot ====
The novel began not as a work for literary consumption, but as an elaborate practical joke aimed at luring the Marquis de Croismare, a companion of Diderot's, back to Paris. The Nun is set in the 18th century, that is, contemporary France. Suzanne Simonin is an intelligent and sensitive sixteen-year-old French girl who is forced against her will into a Catholic convent by her parents. Suzanne's parents initially inform her that she is being sent to the convent for financial reasons. However, while in the convent, she learns that she is actually there because she is an illegitimate child, as her mother committed adultery. By sending Suzanne to the convent, her mother thought she could make amends for her sins by using her daughter as a sacrificial offering.

At the convent, Suzanne suffers humiliation, harassment and violence because she refuses to make the vows of the religious community. She eventually finds companionship with the Mother Superior, Sister de Moni, who pities Suzanne's anguish. After Sister de Moni's death, the new Mother Superior, Sister Sainte-Christine, does not share the same empathy for Suzanne that her predecessor had, blaming Suzanne for the death of Sister de Moni. Suzanne is physically and mentally harassed by Sister Sainte-Christine, almost to the point of death.

Suzanne contacts her lawyer, Monsieur Manouri, who attempts to legally free her from her vows. Manouri manages to have Suzanne transferred to another convent, Sainte-Eutrope. At the new convent, the Mother Superior is revealed to be a lesbian, and she grows affectionate towards Suzanne. The Mother Superior attempts to seduce Suzanne, but her innocence and chastity eventually drives the Mother Superior to insanity, leading to her death.

Suzanne escapes the Sainte-Eutrope convent using the help of a priest. Following her liberation, she lives in fear of being captured and taken back to the convent as she awaits the help from Diderot's friend the Marquis de Croismare.

==== Analysis ====
Diderot's novel was not aimed at condemning Christianity as such but at criticizing cloistered religious life. In Diderot's telling, some critics have claimed, the Church is depicted as fostering a hierarchical society, exemplified in the power dynamic between the Mother Superior and the girls in the convent, forced as they are against their will to take the vows and endure what is to them the intolerable life of the convent. On this view, the subjection of the unwilling young women to convent life dehumanized them by repressing their sexuality. Moreover, their plight would have been all the more oppressive since it should be remembered that in France at this period, religious vows were recognized, regulated and enforced not only by the Church but also by the civil authorities. Some broaden their interpretation to suggest that Diderot was out to expose more general victimization of women by the Catholic Church, that forced them to accept the fate imposed upon them by a hierarchical society.

==== Posthumous publication ====
Although The Nun was completed in about 1780, the work was not published until 1796, after Diderot's death.

=== Rameau's Nephew ===
The dialogue Rameau's Nephew (French: Le Neveu de Rameau) is a "farce-tragedy" reminiscent of the Satires of Horace, a favorite classical author of Diderot's whose lines "Vertumnis, quotquot sunt, natus iniquis" ("Born under (the influence of) the unfavorable (gods) Vertumnuses, however many they are") appear as epigraph. According to Nicholas Cronk, Rameau's Nephew is "arguably the greatest work of the French Enlightenment's greatest writer."

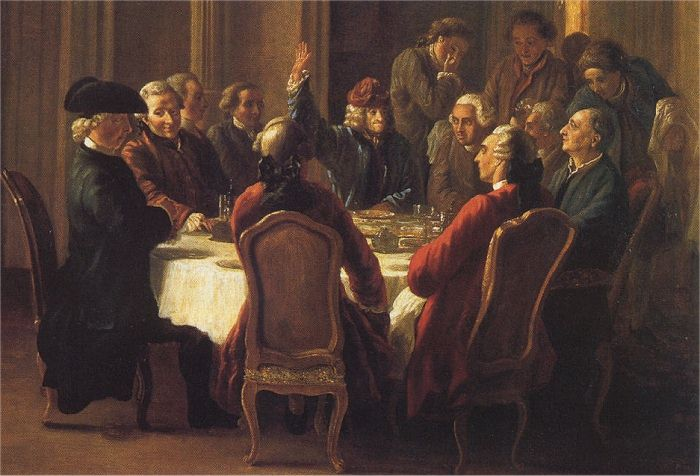
Le Dîner des philosophes painted by Jean Huber. Denis Diderot is the second from the right (seated).

==== Synopsis ====
The narrator in the book recounts a conversation with Jean-François Rameau, nephew of the famous composer Jean-Philippe Rameau. The nephew composes and teaches music with some success but feels disadvantaged by his name and is jealous of his uncle. Eventually he sinks into an indolent and debauched state. After his wife's death, he loses all self-esteem and his brusque manners result in him being ostracized by former friends. A character profile of the nephew is now sketched by Diderot: a man who was once wealthy and comfortable with a pretty wife, who is now living in poverty and decadence, shunned by his friends. And yet this man retains enough of his past to analyze his despondency philosophically and maintains his sense of humor. Essentially he believes in nothing—not in religion, nor in morality; nor in the Roussean view about nature being better than civilization since in his opinion every species in nature consumes one another. He views the same process at work in the economic world where men consume each other through the legal system. The wise man, according to the nephew, will consequently practice hedonism:

Hurrah for wisdom and philosophy!—the wisdom of Solomon: to drink good wines, gorge on choice foods, tumble pretty women, sleep on downy beds; outside of that, all is vanity.

The dialogue ends with Diderot calling the nephew a wastrel, a coward, and a glutton devoid of spiritual values to which the nephew replies: "I believe you are right."

==== Analysis ====
Diderot's intention in writing the dialogue—whether as a satire on contemporary manners, a reduction of the theory of self-interest to an absurdity, the application of irony to the ethics of ordinary convention, a mere setting for a discussion about music, or a vigorous dramatic sketch of a parasite and a human original—is disputed. In political terms it explores "the bipolarisation of the social classes under absolute monarchy," and insofar as its protagonist demonstrates how the servant often manipulates the master, Le Neveu de Rameau can be seen to anticipate Hegel's master–slave dialectic.

==== Posthumous publication ====
The publication history of the Nephew is circuitous. Written between 1761 and 1774, Diderot never saw the work through to publication during his lifetime, and apparently did not even share it with his friends. After Diderot's death, a copy of the text reached Schiller, who gave it to Goethe, who, in 1805, translated the work into German. Goethe's translation entered France, and was retranslated into French in 1821. Another copy of the text was published in 1823, but it had been expurgated by Diderot's daughter prior to publication. The original manuscript was only found in 1891.

== Visual arts ==
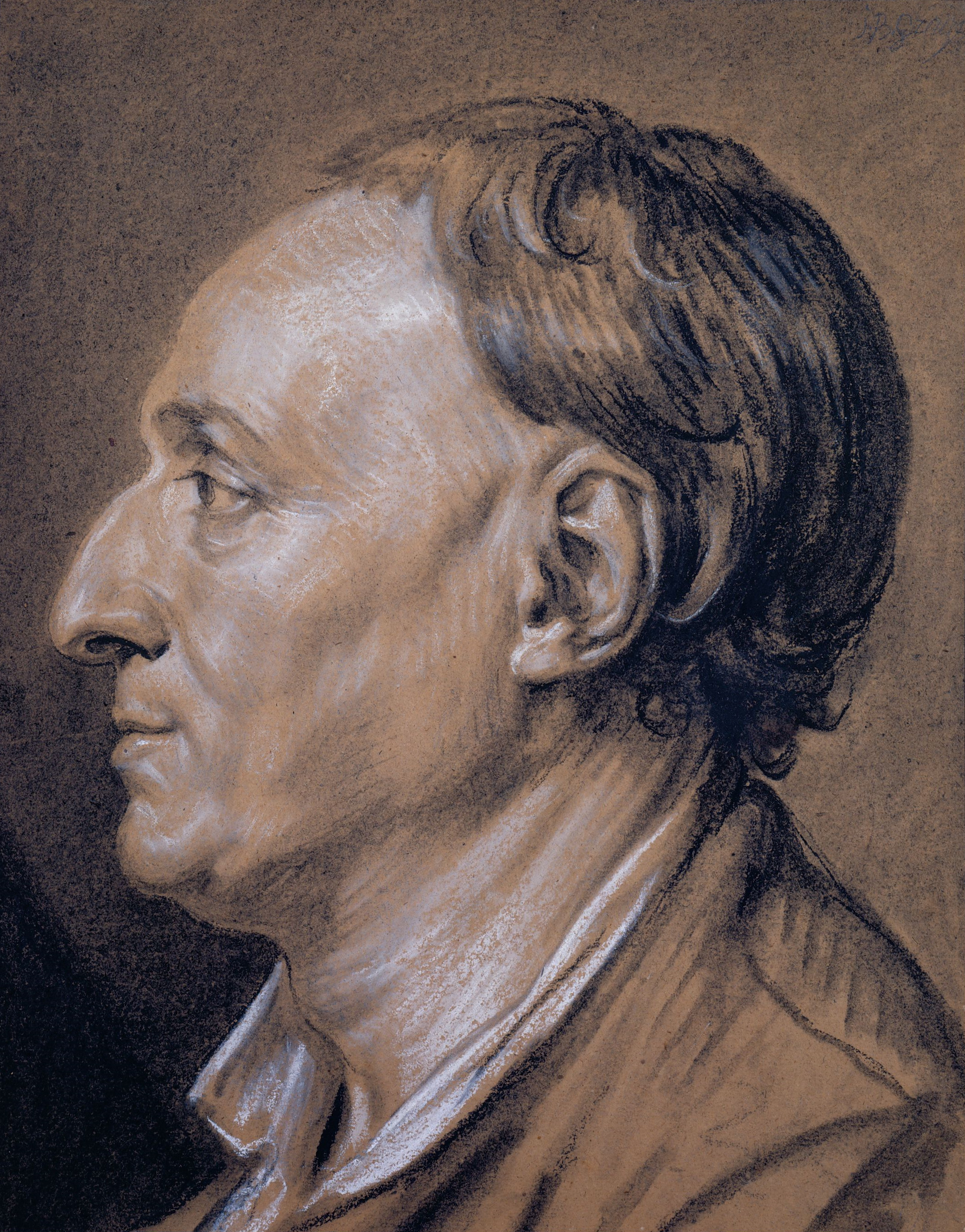
Portrait of Denis Diderot by Jean-Baptiste Greuze (1766)

Diderot's most intimate friend was the philologist Friedrich Melchior Grimm. They were brought together by their common friend at that time, Jean-Jacques Rousseau. In 1753, Grimm began writing a newsletter, the La Correspondance littéraire, philosophique et critique, which he would send to various high personages in Europe.

In 1759, Grimm asked Diderot to report on the biennial art exhibitions in the Louvre for the Correspondance. Diderot reported on the Salons between the Salon of 1759 and Salon of 1771 and again in 1775 and 1781. Diderot's reports would become "the most celebrated contributions to La Correspondance."

According to Charles Augustin Sainte-Beuve, Diderot's reports initiated the French into a new way of laughing, and introduced people to the mystery and purport of colour by ideas. "Before Diderot", Anne Louise Germaine de Staël wrote, "I had never seen anything in pictures except dull and lifeless colours; it was his imagination that gave them relief and life, and it is almost a new sense for which I am indebted to his genius".

Diderot had appended an Essai sur la peinture to his report on the 1765 Salon in which he expressed his views on artistic beauty. Goethe described the Essai sur la peinture as "a magnificent work; it speaks even more usefully to the poet than to the painter, though for the painter too it is a torch of blazing illumination".

Jean-Baptiste Greuze (1725–1805) was Diderot's favorite contemporary artist. Diderot appreciated Greuze's sentimentality, and more particularly Greuze's portrayals of his wife who had once been Diderot's mistress.

== Theatre ==
Diderot wrote sentimental plays, Le Fils naturel (1757) and Le Père de famille (1758), accompanying them with essays on theatrical theory and practice, including "Les Entretiens sur Le Fils Naturel" (Conversations on The Natural Son), in which he announced the principles of a new drama: the 'serious genre', a realistic midpoint between comedy and tragedy that stood in opposition to the stilted conventions of the classical French stage. In 1758, Diderot introduced the concept of the fourth wall, the imaginary "wall" at the front of the stage in a traditional three-walled box set in a proscenium theatre, through which the audience sees the action in the world of the play. He also wrote Paradoxe sur le comédien (Paradox of the Actor), written between 1770 and 1778 but first published after his death in 1830, which is a dramatic essay elucidating a theory of acting in which it is argued that great actors do not experience the emotions they are displaying. (Note: This contradicts the view of Horace with regard to the use of emotion in rhetoric: Si vis me flere, primium tibi flendum est (If you wish me to weep you must first weep yourself).) That essay is also of note for being where the term l'esprit de l'escalier (or l'esprit d'escalier) comes from. It is a French term used in English for the predicament of thinking of the perfect reply too late.

== Diderot and Catherine the Great ==
=== Journey to Russia ===
Diderot's travel from Paris to Saint Petersburg in 1773–1774. The blue line marks the outward from 3 June 1773 until 9 October 1773, and the red line marks the return journey 5 March 1774 to 21 October 1774.

When the Russian Empress Catherine the Great heard that Diderot was in need of money, she arranged to buy his library and appoint him caretaker of it until his death, at a salary of 1,000 livres per year. She even paid him 50 years salary in advance. Although Diderot hated traveling, he was obliged to visit her.

On 9 October 1773, he reached Saint Petersburg, met Catherine the next day and they had several discussions on various subjects. During his five-month stay at her court, he met her almost every day. During these conversations, he would later state, they spoke 'man to man'. (Note: Diderot later narrated the following conversation as having taken place: Catherine: "You have a hot head, and I have one too. We interrupt each other, we do not hear what the other one says, and so we say stupid things." Diderot: "With this difference, that when I interrupt your Majesty, I commit a great impertinence." Catherine: "No, between men there is no such thing as impertinence.")

He would occasionally make his point by slapping her thighs. In a letter to Madame Geoffrin, Catherine wrote:

Your Diderot is an extraordinary man. I emerge from interviews with him with my thighs bruised and quite black. I have been obliged to put a table between us to protect myself and my members.

One of the topics discussed was Diderot's ideas about how to transform Russia into a utopia. In a letter to Comte de Ségur, the Empress wrote that if she followed Diderot's advice, chaos would ensue in her kingdom.

=== Back in France ===
When returning, Diderot asked the Empress for 1,500 rubles as reimbursement for his trip. She gave him 3,000 rubles, an expensive ring, and an officer to escort him back to Paris. He wrote a eulogy in her honor upon reaching Paris.

In 1766, when Catherine heard that Diderot had not received his annual fee for editing the Encyclopédie (an important source of income for the philosopher), she arranged for him to receive a massive sum of 50,000 livres as an advance for his services as her librarian.

In July 1784, upon hearing that Diderot was in poor health, Catherine arranged for him to move into a luxurious suite in the Rue de Richelieu. Diderot died two weeks after moving there—on 31 July 1784.

Among Diderot's last works were notes "On the Instructions of her Imperial Majesty...for the Drawing up of Laws". This commentary on Russia included replies to some arguments Catherine had made in the Nakaz. Diderot wrote that Catherine was certainly despotic, due to circumstances and training, but was not inherently tyrannical. Thus, if she wished to destroy despotism in Russia, she should abdicate her throne and destroy anyone who tries to revive the monarchy. She should publicly declare that "there is no true sovereign other than the nation, and there can be no true legislator other than the people." She should create a new Russian legal code establishing an independent legal framework and starting with the text: "We the people, and we the sovereign of this people, swear conjointly these laws, by which we are judged equally." In the Nakaz, Catherine had written: "It is for legislation to follow the spirit of the nation." Diderot's rebuttal stated that it is for legislation to make the spirit of the nation. For instance, he argued, it is not appropriate to make public executions unnecessarily horrific.

Ultimately, Diderot decided not to send these notes to Catherine; however, they were delivered to her with his other papers after he died. When she read them, she was furious and commented that they were an incoherent gibberish devoid of prudence, insight, and verisimilitude.

== Philosophy ==
Dmitry Levitzky, Denis Diderot, 1773, Musée d'Art et d'Histoire, Geneva

In his youth, Diderot was originally a follower of Voltaire and his deist Anglomanie, but gradually moved away from this line of thought towards materialism and atheism, a move which was finally realised in 1747 in the philosophical debate in the second part of his The Skeptic's Walk (1747). Diderot opposed mysticism and occultism, which were highly prevalent in France at the time he wrote, and believed religious truth claims must fall under the domain of reason, not mystical experience or esoteric secrets. However, Diderot showed some interest in the work of Paracelsus. He was "a philosopher in whom all the contradictions of the time struggle with one another" (Rosenkranz).

In his 1754 book On the Interpretation of Nature, Diderot expounded on his views about nature, evolution, materialism, mathematics, and experimental science. It is speculated that Diderot may have contributed to his friend Baron d'Holbach's 1770 book The System of Nature. Diderot had enthusiastically endorsed the book stating that:

What I like is a philosophy clear, definite, and frank, such as you have in the System of Nature. The author is not an atheist on one page and a deist on another. His philosophy is all of one piece.

In conceiving the Encyclopédie, Diderot had thought of the work as a fight on behalf of posterity and had expressed confidence that posterity would be grateful for his effort. According to Diderot, "posterity is for the philosopher what the 'other world' is for the man of religion."

According to Andrew S. Curran, the main questions of Diderot's thought are the following :

- Why be moral in a world without god?
- How should we appreciate art?
- What are we and where do we come from?
- What are sex and love?
- How can a philosopher intervene in political affairs?

== Death and burial ==
Diderot died of pulmonary thrombosis in Paris on 31 July 1784, and was buried in the city's Église Saint-Roch. His heirs sent his vast library to Catherine II, who had it deposited at the National Library of Russia. He has several times been denied burial in the Panthéon with other French notables.

Diderot's remains were unearthed by grave robbers in 1793, leaving his corpse on the church's floor. His remains were then presumably transferred to a mass grave by the authorities.

== Appreciation and influence ==
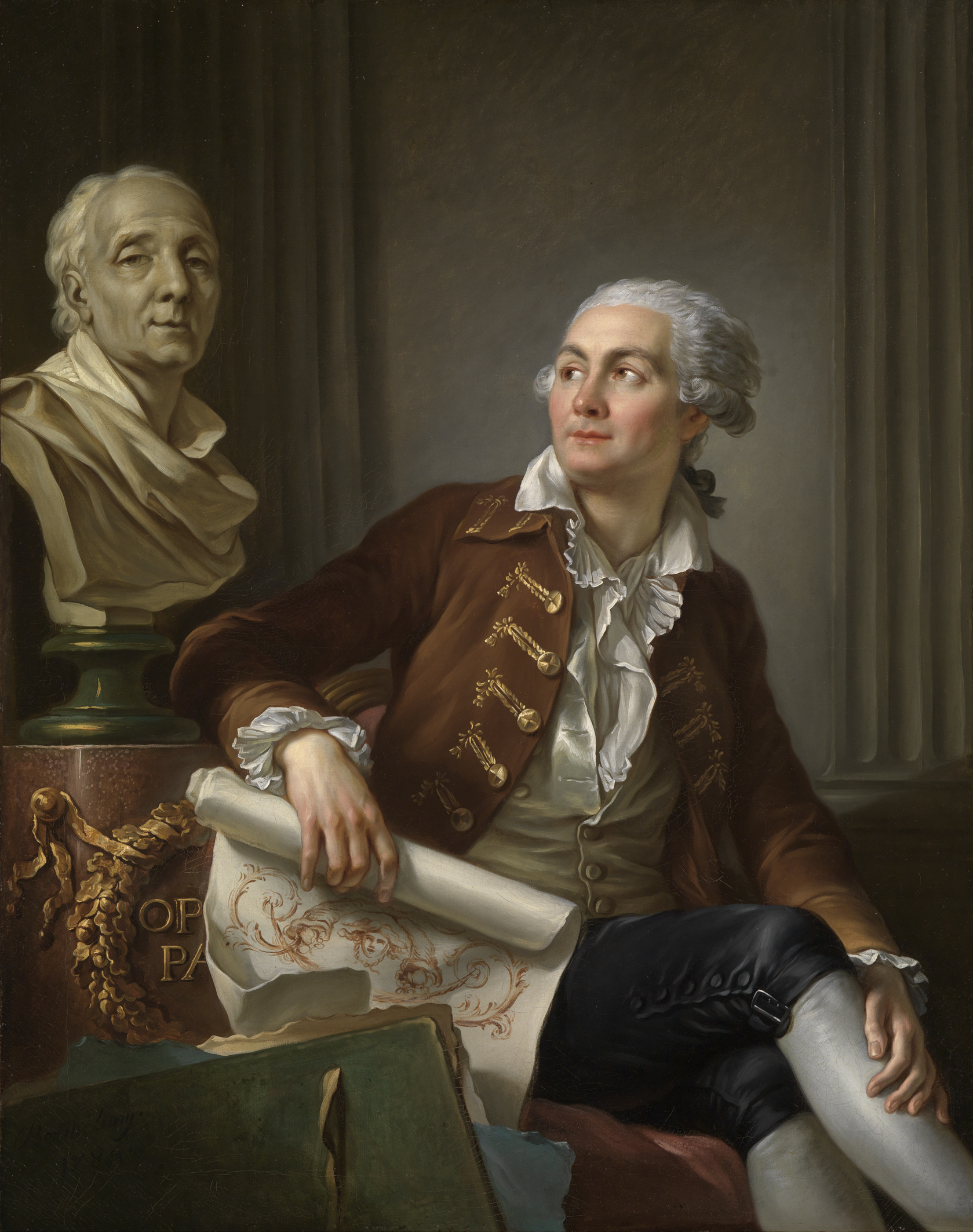
Jean-Simon Berthélemy, Young man admiring Denis Diderot's bust

Marmontel and Henri Meister commented on the great pleasure of having intellectual conversations with Diderot. Morellet, a regular attendee at D'Holbach's salon, wrote: "It is there that I heard...Diderot treat questions of philosophy, art, or literature, and by his wealth of expression, fluency, and inspired appearance, hold our attention for a long stretch of time." Diderot's contemporary, and rival, Jean Jacques Rousseau wrote in his Confessions that after a few centuries Diderot would be accorded as much respect by posterity as was given to Plato and Aristotle. In Germany, Goethe, Schiller, and Lessing expressed admiration for Diderot's writings, Goethe pronouncing Diderot's Rameau's Nephew to be "the classical work of an outstanding man" and that "Diderot is Diderot, a unique individual; whoever carps at him and his affairs is a philistine."

As atheism fell out of favor during the French Revolution, Diderot was vilified and considered responsible for the excessive persecution of the clergy.

In the next century, Diderot was admired by Balzac, Delacroix, Stendhal, Zola, and Schopenhauer. According to Comte, Diderot was the foremost intellectual in an exciting age. Historian Michelet described him as "the true Prometheus" and stated that Diderot's ideas would continue to remain influential long into the future. Marx chose Diderot as his "favourite prose-writer."

== Modern tributes ==
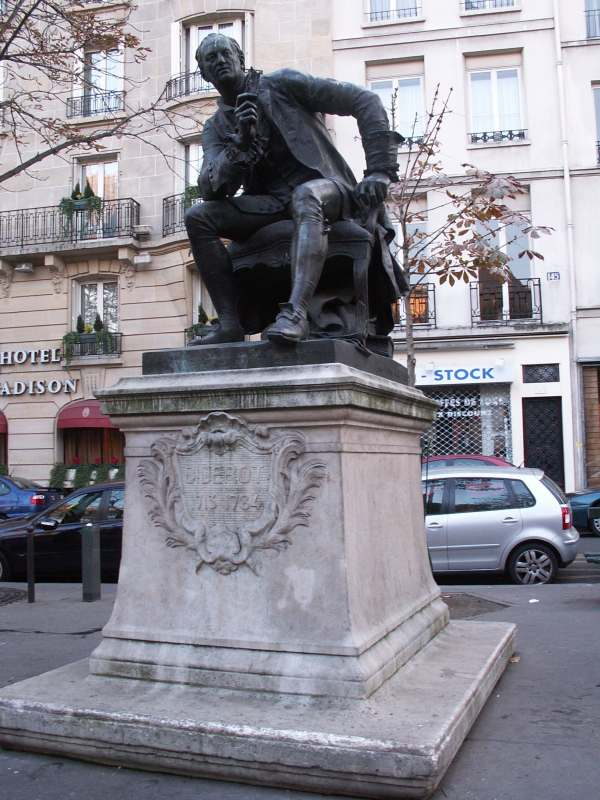
Monument to Denis Diderot in Paris, 6th arrondissement, by Jean Gautherin

Otis Fellows and Norman Torrey have described Diderot as "the most interesting and provocative figure of the French eighteenth century."

In 1993, American writer Cathleen Schine published Rameau's Niece, a satire of academic life in New York that took as its premise a woman's research into an (imagined) 18th-century pornographic parody of Diderot's Rameau's Nephew. The book was praised by Michiko Kakutani in the New York Times as "a nimble philosophical satire of the academic mind" and "an enchanting comedy of modern manners."

French author Eric-Emmanuel Schmitt wrote a play titled Le Libertin (The Libertine) which imagines a day in Diderot's life including a fictional sitting for a woman painter which becomes sexually charged but is interrupted by the demands of editing the Encyclopédie. It was first staged at Paris' Théâtre Montparnasse in 1997 starring Bernard Giraudeau as Diderot and Christiane Cohendy as Madame Therbouche and was well received by critics.

In 2013, the 300th anniversary of Diderot's birth, his hometown of Langres held a series of events in his honor and produced an audio tour of the town highlighting places that were part of Diderot's past, including the remains of the convent where his sister Angélique took her vows. On 6 October 2013, a museum of the Enlightenment focusing on Diderot's contributions to the movement, the Maison des Lumières Denis Diderot, was inaugurated in Langres.

The French government considered memorializing the 300th anniversary of his birth, but this did not come to pass.

== Bibliography ==
- Essai sur le mérite et la vertu, written by Shaftesbury French translation and annotation by Diderot (1745)
- Philosophical Thoughts, essay (1746)
- La Promenade du sceptique (1747)
- The Indiscreet Jewels, novel (1748)
- Lettre sur les aveugles à l'usage de ceux qui voient (1749)
- Encyclopédie (1750–1765)
- Lettre sur les sourds et muets (1751)
- Pensées sur l'interprétation de la nature, essai (1751)
- Systeme de la Nature (1754)
- Le Fils naturel (1757)
- Entretiens sur le Fils naturel (1757)
- Le père de famille (1758)
- Discours sur la poesie dramatique (1758)
- Salons, critique d'art (1759–1781)
- La Religieuse, Roman (1760; revised in 1770 and in the early 1780s; the novel was first published as a volume posthumously in 1796).
- Le neveu de Rameau, dialogue (written between 1761 and 1774).
- Lettre sur le commerce de la librairie (1763)
- Jacques le fataliste et son maître, novel (written between 1765 and 1780; first published posthumously in 1796)
- Mystification ou l'histoire des portraits (1768)
- Entretien entre D'Alembert et Diderot (1769)
- Le rêve de D'Alembert, dialogue (1769)
- Suite de l'entretien entre D'Alembert et Diderot (1769)
- Paradoxe sur le comédien (written between 1770 and 1778; first published posthumously in 1830)
- Apologie de l'abbé Galiani (1770)
- Principes philosophiques sur la matière et le mouvement, essai (1770)
- Entretien d'un père avec ses enfants (1771)
- Ceci n'est pas un conte, story (1772)
- Madame de La Carlière, short story and moral fable, (1772)
- Supplément au voyage de Bougainville (1772)
- Histoire philosophique et politique des deux Indes, in collaboration with Raynal (1772–1781)
- Voyage en Hollande (1773)
- Éléments de physiologie (1773–1774)
- Réfutation d'Helvétius (1774)
- Observations sur le Nakaz (1774)
- Essai sur les règnes de Claude et de Néron (1778)
- Est-il Bon? Est-il méchant? (1781)
- Lettre apologétique de l'abbé Raynal à Monsieur Grimm (1781)
- Aux insurgents d'Amérique (1782)

== See also ==
- Contributions to liberal theory
- Diderot effect
- Encyclopedist
- Encyclopédistes
- Leonhard Euler
- List of liberal theorists
- Society of the Friends of Truth
- Paris Diderot University
