= Histoire des deux Indes =

1770 encyclopaedia

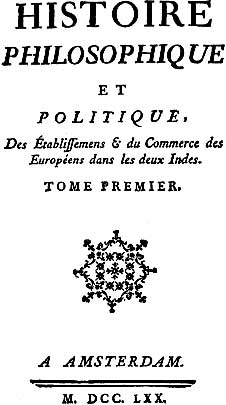
- Author: Guillaume Thomas Raynal; Denis Diderot; Paul Henri Thiry d'Holbach; Jacques-André Naigeon; Jean de Pechméja; Jean-François de Saint-Lambert; Joseph-Louis Lagrange; Jacques-André Naigeon and others
- Original title: Histoire philosophique et politique des établissements et du commerce des Européens dans les deux Indes
- Working title: Histoire des deux Indes
- Genre: Encyclopaedia
- Published: 1770
- Publication place: France

The Histoire philosophique et politique des établissements et du commerce des Européens dans les deux Indes, more often known simply as Histoire des deux Indes, is an encyclopaedia on commerce between Europe and the Far East, Africa, and the Americas. It was published anonymously in Amsterdam in 1770 and attributed to Abbot Guillaume Thomas Raynal. It achieved considerable popularity and went through numerous editions. The third edition, published in Geneva in 1780, was censored in France the following year.

The Histoire des deux Indes filled a public need for knowledge in the Age of Enlightenment, answering questions that preoccupied the minds of those in the late 18th century, around the time of the French Revolution.

== Content ==
Raynal's idea was to write a history of European enterprises in the East Indies and the New World, having observed the influence of the great explorations on European civilisation.

The work first discusses the Portuguese and their oriental colonies, going on to give a history of British and French enterprises, then Spanish, Dutch, and other European powers, in the Orient. Next, it turns its attention to all of the various European conquests, losses, colonies and commerce in the Americas. European commerce with various coastal regions of Africa is discussed, mainly on slavery and particularly trans-Atlantic slave trade. Finally, there is a series of essays on religion, politics, war, commerce, moral philosophy, belles-lettres, and so on.

== Style ==
The Histoire des deux Indes lacks consistency in its style: Raynal limited himself to collecting articles provided by friends and pieces borrowed from existing published texts, without taking the trouble to rework them.

== Authors ==
Although the book was published anonymously, some authors are known, if only in name.

- According to Melchior Grimm, Denis Diderot contributed a large part of the work. He is certainly one of its main contributors, and it is estimated he wrote between a third and a fifth of the book, especially the parts on philosophical themes.
- The nineteenth chapter, summarising doctrine and drawing conclusions, was by Alexandre Deleyre.
- On subjects concerning commerce, Raynal used the writings of Jacques Paulze, d’Aranda and Manuel de Faria e Sousa.
- On philosophical subjects, in addition to Diderot, he used the writings of Paul Henri Thiry d'Holbach, Jacques-André Naigeon and Jean de Pechméja
- He also used work by Abbé Martin, the medical doctor Dubreuil, Valadier, Jean-François de Saint-Lambert, Joseph-Louis Lagrange and Jacques-André Naigeon.

Proud of his work, Raynal sometimes forgot it was only as good as its contributors made it. This can be seen in the pieces supplied by a Dr Sanchez, the author on Portugal and its possessions in the East and West Indies. Pechméja once found Sébastien-Roch Nicolas de Chamfort reading the Histoire des deux Indes: "What have you found?", he asked. "I have just been reading an excellent piece, but it finishes with such an awful turn of phrase" (French: Je viens de lire un morceau excellent, mais qui se termine par une phrase pitoyable). "Let me see: you're right. I much think that Raynal writes is nonsense; he has added that phrase, the rest is mine". (French: Faites-moi donc voir; vous avez raison. Je pensais bien que Raynal ferait des sottises; il a ajouté cette phrase, le reste est de moi.) When Raynal left Paris, Chamford said Il est fatigué de vivre avec son auteur ("He is tired of living with his author").

== Reception ==
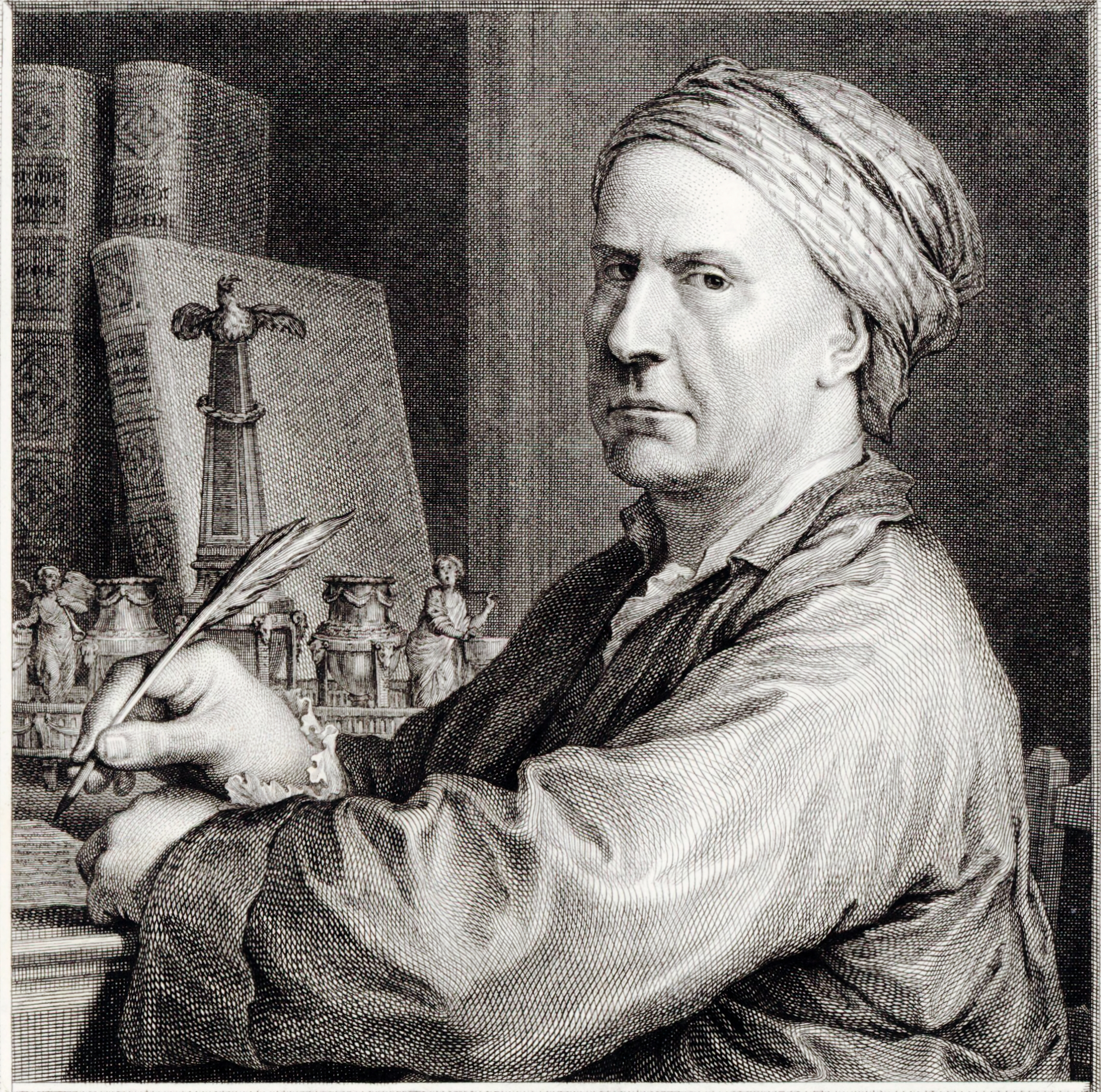
Portrait of Guillaume-Thomas Raynal signing the third edition

The Histoire des deux Indes was a great success. In France, over thirty different editions were published between 1770 and 1787, and over fifty were published abroad. Abridged versions were published called Esprit de Raynal ("Potted Raynal") and Raynal de la jeunesse ("Children's Raynal"). Napoleon Bonaparte proclaimed himself a "willing disciple of Raynal" (French: zélé disciple de Raynal) and took the book with him on his Egyptian campaign. Toussaint Louverture read the book and was especially inspired by a passage that predicted slave revolution in the West Indies. Horace Walpole wrote to Marie Du Deffand: "It attacks all governments and all religions!" (French: Il attaque tous les gouvernements et toutes les religions!). Anne Robert Jacques Turgot heavily criticized the book in a letter to André Morellet:

Il est tantôt rigoriste comme Richardson, tantôt immoral comme Helvétius, tantôt enthousiaste des vertus douces et tendres, tantôt de la débauche, tantôt du courage féroce; traitant l’esclavage d’abominable et voulant des esclaves; déraisonnant en physique, déraisonnant en métaphysique et souvent en politique. Il ne résulte rien de son livre, sinon que l’auteur est un homme de beaucoup d’esprit, très instruit, mais qui n’a aucune idée arrêtée, et qui se laisse emporter par l’enthousiasme d’un jeune rhéteur. Il semble avoir pris à tâche de soutenir tous les paradoxes qui se sont présentés à lui dans ses lectures et dans ses rêves.

(He is sometimes dogmatic like Richardson, sometimes immoral like Helvetius, sometimes an enthusiast of sweet and tender virtues, sometimes of debauchery, sometimes of fierce courage; treating slavery as abominable and wanting slaves; unreasoning in physics, unreasoning in metaphysics and often in politics. Nothing comes out of his book, other than that the author is a man of much spirit, well educated, but who has not one firm idea, and who is carried away by the enthusiasm of a young rhetorician. He seems to have undertaken the task of upholding all the paradoxes that are presented to him in his readings and in his dreams.)

At the time, the Histoire des deux Indes was considered an encyclopaedia of the colonial age and the Bible of anticolonialism in the Age of Enlightenment.

In 1780, Raynal produced the third edition of his Histoire des deux Indes, which was characterised by bolder and more violent tirades than the previous two, and under his signature at the bottom of his portrait he added the inscription: Au défenseur de l’humanité, de la vérité, de la liberté ("In defence of humanity, truth, and freedom").

Louis XVI referred the book to the Parlement of Paris for censorship, and also to the Church. It was banned, and burned by the public hangman on 29 May 1781. Declared a public enemy, Raynal was forced to leave France for Prussia, where he stayed the large part of his exile. He was allowed to return to France in 1787, on condition he did not enter Paris.

Today, scholar Jenny Mander notes that there are mixed feelings and overall confusion as to whether Histoire des deux Indes is an anti-colonialist text since there are so many contradictions within the piece itself. On the one side, Raynal makes many statements that are against the overall inhumanity of Europeans and criticizes their seizing of land that is taken solely for European gain and leaves native people vulnerable. For these reasons, some do consider the text to be anti-colonialist. On the other hand, Raynal and his contributors still find slaves and slave labor as essential to the European economy, and they hold their plans for instant emancipation for all slaves. With so many opposing opinions and several other writers who contributed their perspective, reception today is also clearly quite jumbled.

== Editions ==
=== Current ===
- Histoire philosophique et politique des établissements et du commerce des Européens dans les deux Indes. Paris: Bibliothèque des introuvables. 2006. ISBN 978-2-84575-194-1.

=== Available online ===
- 1770: Histoire philosophique et politique des établissemens & du commerce des européens dans les deux Indes], Amsterdam, [s.n.], 1770, 6 octavo volumes, at available at Gallica
- 1773: Atlas portatif pour servir l'intelligence de l'histoire philosophique et politique des établissements et du commerce des Européens dans les deux Indes , Amsterdam, 1773
- 1780: Histoire philosophique et politique des établissemens et du commerce des Européens dans les deux Indes, Geneva, J.-L. Pellet, 1780, 4 volumes plus an atlas in quarto, BnF No. FRBNF31182796m
- 1783, English translation of the French 3rd edition which was published in 1780: A philosophical and political history of the settlements and trade of the Europeans in the East and West Indies, translated by J. O. Justamond, London, W. Strahan and T. Cadell, 1783, 8 volumes, available (Volume 1, 2, 3, 4, 5, 6, 7, 8) at the Internet Archive.

== Sources ==
- Duchet, Michèle (1978). Diderot et l'Histoire des deux Indes : ou, L'écriture fragmentaire [Diderot and the Histoire des deux Indes: or, fragmentary writing] (in French). Paris: A.-G. Nizet.
- Esquer, Gabriel (1951). L'Anticolonialisme au XVIIIeme siecle: Histoire philosophique et politique des établissements et du commerce des Européens dans les deux Indes [Anticolonialism in the 18th century: History of Philosophy and Politics on European establishments and commerce in the two Indes] (in French). Paris: Presses universitaires de France.
- Lüsebrink, Hans-Jürgen; Strugnell, Anthony (1995). L'Histoire des deux Indes: réécriture et polygraphie (in French). Oxford: Voltaire Foundation.
- Wolpe, Hans (1957). Raynal et sa machine de guerre; l'Histoire des deux Indes et ses perfectionnements [Raynal and his war machine: the Histoire des dex Indes and its perfections] (in French). Stanford, Stanford University Press.
- Vapereau, Gustave (1876). Dictionnaire universel des littératures (in French). Paris: Hachette. p. 496.
- Revue historique. 77 (May–August). Paris: Alcan: 329. 1898.
