= Atheism during the Age of Enlightenment =

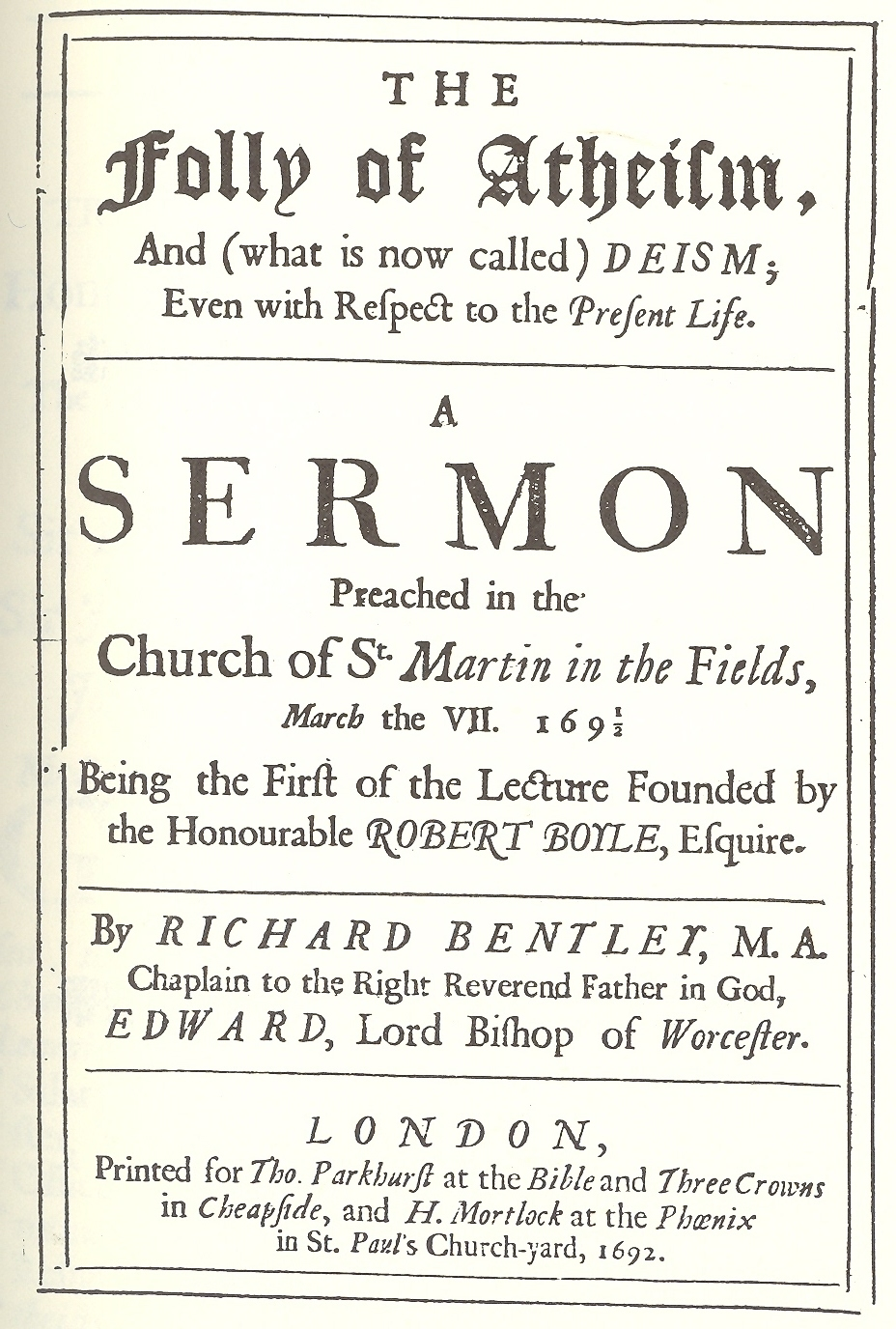
Frontispiece to Richard Bentley's The Folly of Atheism (Boyle Lectures, 1692)

Atheism, as defined by the entry in Diderot and d'Alembert's Encyclopédie, is "the opinion of those who deny the existence of a God in the world. The simple ignorance of God doesn't constitute atheism. To be charged with the odious title of atheism one must have the notion of God and reject it." In the period of the Enlightenment, avowed and open atheism was made possible by the advance of religious toleration, but was also far from encouraged.

Accusations of atheism were common, but most of the people suspected by their peers of atheism were not actually atheists. D'Holbach and Denis Diderot seem to be two of the very small number of publicly identified atheists in Europe during this period. Thomas Hobbes was widely viewed as an atheist for his materialist interpretation of scripture—Henry Hammond, a former friend, described him in a letter as a "Christian Atheist". David Hume was accused of atheism for his writings on the "natural history of religion"; Pierre Bayle was accused of atheism for defending the possibility of an ethical atheist society in his Critical Dictionary, and Baruch Spinoza was frequently regarded as an atheist for his "pantheism". However, all three of these figures defended themselves against such accusations.

== Rise of toleration ==
In the Reformation and Counter-Reformation eras, Europe was a "persecuting society" which did not tolerate religious minorities or atheism. Even in France, where the Edict of Nantes had been issued in 1598, then revoked in 1685, there was very little support for religious toleration at the beginning of the eighteenth century. States were concerned with maintaining religious uniformity for two reasons: first, they believed that their chosen confession was the way to God and other religions were heretical, and second, religious unity was necessary for social and political stability. The advancement of toleration was the result of pragmatic political motives as well as the principles espoused by Enlightenment philosophes. Religion was a central topic of conversation during much of the eighteenth century. It was the subject of debate in the coffeehouses and debate societies of Enlightenment Europe, and a bone of contention among the philosophes. Michael J. Buckley describes the rise of toleration, and of atheism itself, as a response to religious violence in the preceding years: the expulsion of the Huguenots from France, the Spanish inquisition, the witch trials, the civil wars of England, Scotland and the Netherlands. Buckley argues that "religious warfare had irrevocably discredited confessional primacy in the growing secularized sensitivity of much of European culture." This is a view echoed by Ole Peter Brell and Ray Porter. Marisa Linton, however, points out that it was a common conception that religious diversity would lead to unrest and possibly civil war.

According to Justin Champion, the question in England was not one of determining religious truth, whether or not there was a god, but rather one of understanding how the priesthood had gained the power to determine what was accepted as truth. Republican radicals like Henry Stubbe, Charles Blount and John Toland understood religion as a social and cultural institution, rather than as transcendent principles. They were primarily motivated by priestly fraud or "priestcraft". The second half of Thomas Hobbes' book Leviathan contains an example of this sort of anticlerical thought. Hobbes, like Toland and other anticlerical writers of the period, understood religion in terms of history. By viewing religious truth and the church as separate, they helped open the way for further religious dissent.

Because France was an absolutist monarchy in which the king was seen as ruling by divine right, it was generally thought that French people had to share his religious views. The Edict of Nantes, which granted toleration to the Huguenot minority in France, was revoked in 1685. Marisa Linton argues that while the philosophes did contribute to some extent to the rise of French toleration, the activities of French Huguenots also played a part: they began to worship more publicly in the more remote regions of France, and their continued loyalty to the French crown on the eve of and during the Seven Years' War may have helped to ease the monarch's suspicions about their faith. In the mid-eighteenth century, Jansenist intellectuals began campaigning for religious toleration for Calvinists. Linton argues that together, these causes shifted public opinion towards religious toleration. Religious toleration was not accepted by everyone; for instance, Abbé Houtteville condemned the rise of toleration in France because it weakened ecclesiastical authority and encouraged irreligion. However, in 1787 Louis XVI granted an Edict of Toleration acknowledging their civil rights to marry and own property, although they were still denied the official right to worship and could not hold public office or become teachers. Full religious toleration for Protestants would not be granted until the French Revolution.

Toleration itself boiled down to two different factions. The "acceptable face" of toleration was essentially the mainstream view, the freedom of worship and peaceful coexistence of different churches. This view was supported by Kant, Locke, Voltaire and Hume, as the public face of the Enlightenment. The Radical Enlightenment, on the other hand, was the view of toleration where the radicals demanded freedom of thought and expression, rather than existing peacefully among each other. This movement was shaped by the lesser-known figures of d'Holbach, Diderot, Condorcet, and, in particular, Spinoza, who provided the heart and soul of this faction. Where reason reigned supreme for the radicals, the moderate thinkers maintained that reason must be limited by faith and tradition. Together, the two different views of Enlightenment forged powerfully contrasting notions of toleration.

=== Writers on toleration ===
The Dutch Jew Spinoza argued for individual freedom to express personal beliefs, while discouraging large congregations unless they belonged to a somewhat deistic idealized state religion. According to Spinoza, freedom of thought, speech and expression were the core values of toleration—as such, Spinoza opposed censorship. Jonathan Israel summarized his position, that anti-toleration laws were engineered "for personal advantage but also at great cost to the state and the public", and that they exacerbated religious conflict rather than diminishing it. Spinoza constructed his theories about toleration based on a freedom to think rather than the right to worship, and was established according to philosophical principles rather than being based on any interpretation of scripture. Consequently, Spinoza was essentially arguing for everyone, atheists, Catholics and Jews included.

Pierre Bayle was a strong advocate of tolerance, the basis of a quarrel with Louis XIV. He even defended the idea of an ethical atheist society in his famous dictionary. Martin Fitzpatrick credits him with making a "powerful contribution to the way philosophes would wage war on intolerance and superstition". Although he wanted to diminish the influence of Spinoza, Bayle was treated in a similar fashion by the Huguenots of the United Provinces, who saw him as a dangerous thinker and a potential atheist.

John Locke suggested a pragmatic view of toleration, although he advanced a concept of toleration only between certain Christian sects. He vehemently denied the atheists' right to toleration since they did not believe in a god, practiced no recognizable form of worship, and were not seeking to save their souls. He similarly denied toleration to Catholics on the grounds that papal authority made them a danger to the state. In essence, Locke advanced a freedom of worship, not a freedom of thought. The vast majority of eighteenth-century writers, like Locke, had no interest in granting religious tolerance to ideas that deviated from the core of revealed religion. Most of these writers were strongly opposed to Spinoza's ideal of toleration, which is "chiefly about individual freedom and decidedly not the freedom of large ecclesiastical structures to impose themselves on society".

Voltaire, in his 1763 "A Treatise on Toleration", continued in the tradition of John Locke, arguing that toleration allowed communication and good relationships between differing confessions in the marketplace. Allowing the Huguenots to return to France would boost the French economy. He would not be the only one to espouse this viewpoint.

Opponents tended to conflate the views of those who wrote in favour of toleration under the heading of dangerous anti-orthodoxy and atheism, despite their radically differing viewpoints and confessions.

== Related philosophical movements ==
=== Deism ===
Deism is the philosophical belief in a deity based on reason rather than religious revelation or dogma. It was a popular perception among the philosophes, who adopted deistic attitudes to varying degrees. Deism, in this respect, is very different from atheism, which denies the existence of a deity altogether. Voltaire, for instance, was convinced that the existence of god was a demonstrable fact. The deistic god, however, often bore little resemblance to the God of Christian scripture, which meant that deists were often heavily criticized by the adherents of confessional faiths and could be accused of atheism.

Deists often pushed for religious toleration, a move which would have supported the open expression of atheism. This is not because they supported atheism—they did not—but because deist philosophers tended to be in favour of the civil freedom of conscience. As Michael J. Buckley writes, "If atheism was unacceptable, superstition and fanaticism were even more so." Deists were not pro-atheist, but their anticlerical leanings indirectly benefited the evolution of atheism.

In historiographical terms, it has been quite common to see a close link between deism and atheism. Buckley critiques Peter Gay's view of the direct tie between deism and atheism, writing, "the vectors which Gay charts are certainly there, but the distinction may be somewhat too neat, too overdrawn." Louis Dupré describes deism as "the result of a filtering process that had strained off all historical and dogmatic data from Christian theology and retained only that minimum which, by eighteenth-century standards, reason demands." Atheism is perhaps the same process taken a step further. Buckley credits the rise of atheism with the gradual submission of theology to philosophy—as thinkers, including church leaders, began to argue religion on philosophical terms, they opened the way for disbelief—they made atheism thinkable. Deism is, in this perspective, a complicated waypoint on the path to atheism: deism is the philosophical belief in a deity based on reason. Once belief in God is based on reason, it becomes thinkable to reason one's way into disbelief.

=== Freemasonry ===
Freemasons in continental Europe during the Enlightenment era were accused of atheism. The masonic "Constitutions" of 1723 are vague on the matter of religion, stating that if a Freemason "rightly understands the Art, he will never be a stupid Atheist, nor an irreligious Libertine", while also asking that he follow "that religion to which all men agree, leaving their particular opinions to themselves". Although Masonic literature referred sporadically and vaguely to a "Grand Architect of the Universe", their secretive practices made the religious affiliation of each Freemason a matter of speculation.

Freemasonic culture originated in Britain and spread to the Continent, bringing with it ideas about natural rights and the rights of the governed. In some areas, Continental Freemasonry may have drawn from more subversive English sources. Margaret C. Jacob outlines a relationship between John Toland and Dutch Freemasonry; Jean Rousset de Missy, the founder of the Masonic lodge in the Dutch Republic in 1735 was a self-described pantheist, borrowing the term coined by Toland. Jacob argues that "there is a streak of freethinking or deism that turns up at moments in the history of Continental Freemasonry right into, and especially during, the 1790s." This religious ambiguity could be interpreted as contributing to the "thinkability" of atheism.

== Contemporary perspectives ==
=== Spinoza ===
Baruch Spinoza (1632–1677), in his 1670 Theologico-Political Treatise, criticized Judaism (his birth religion) and all organized religion. His philosophical orientation is often called "pantheism", a term coined by John Toland after Spinoza's death. However, in the late seventeenth and eighteenth centuries, Spinoza's name was often associated with atheism, freethinking, materialism, deism, and any other heterodox religious belief. Whether or not "pantheism" constitutes atheism is still debated by modern scholars.

=== Pierre Bayle ===
Pierre Bayle (1647–1706) was widely accused of atheism for his espousal of religious toleration, although he professed himself a Huguenot. He encountered a great deal of criticism for defending atheism. In his Dictionnaire historique et critique he stated that while atheists were "exceedingly blind and ignorant of the nature of things" there were many atheists "who are no way distinguished for their vices", and that "if atheists exist, who, morally speaking, are well-disposed, it follows that Atheism is not a necessary cause of immorality, but simply an incidental one in regard to those who would have been immoral from disposition or temperament, whether Atheists or not." In response to criticism, he included an essay "Clarifications: On Atheists" in the 1702 edition of the Dictionary. In it, he continued defending his thesis that "there have been atheists and Epicureans whose propriety in moral matters has surpassed that of most idolators", arguing that religion is not the sole basis of morality. It is, he wrote, "a very likely possibility that some men without religion are more motivated to lead a decent, moral life by their constitution, in conjunction with the love of praise and the fear of disgrace, than are some others by the instincts of conscience."

=== David Hume ===
David Hume (1711–1776) was often seen as an atheist in his own day. His skeptical attitude toward religion in such works as "Of Superstition and Religion", "Essays Moral and Political", "On Suicide", "On the Immortality of the Soul", "Dialogues Concerning Natural Religion", as well as his death-bed conversations with Boswell (later published), earned Hume the reputation as a practicing atheist. Hume was even turned down for a teaching position at the University of Edinburgh in the 1740s because of his alleged atheism.

=== Diderot ===
Denis Diderot (1713–1784) was one of the central guests of d'Holbach's salon and the primary editor of the Encyclopédie. Although Diderot wrote extensively about atheism, he was not as polemic as d'Holbach or Naigeon—instead of publishing his atheistic works, he tended to circulate them among his friends or give them to Naigeon for posthumous publishing. Diderot espoused a materialist worldview. He attempted to solve the problems of how the cosmos could begin without a creator, and theorized about how life could come from inorganic matter. According to Dupré, Diderot concluded that if one abandons "the unproved principle that the cosmos must have a beginning" then the need to establish the "efficient cause" of creation is no longer a problem. Diderot thought that the origin of life might be a process of the natural internal evolution of matter.

=== D'Holbach ===
Baron d'Holbach (1723–1789) was the central figure of the 'coterie holbachique' and the salon he hosted in his Paris home. The salon has been interpreted as a meeting place for Parisian atheists, based on an anecdote in which D'Holbach told David Hume, who claimed not to believe anything, that of the eighteen guests at his salon, fifteen were atheists and three had not yet decided. There is some doubt as to the accuracy of this statement. In any case, D'Holbach himself was a professed atheist. The salon was the site of a great deal of discussion about atheism, and the atheistic and theistic guests seem to have spent a great deal of time good-naturedly arguing for their respective positions. Despite claims that the salon was a hotbed of atheism, there seem to only have been three convinced atheists in regular attendance: D'Holbach, Denis Diderot and Jacques-André Naigeon.

D'Holbach's written works often included atheistic themes. Alan Charles Kors cites three in particular, Système de la nature, Le Bon-sens and La Morale universelle as being particularly concerned with advancing the cause of atheism. Kors summarized some of the basic themes of these three texts as the idea that rigorous materialism was the only coherent viewpoint, and that "the only humane and beneficial morality was one deduced from the imperatives for the happiness and survival of mankind." What was relatively unique about D'Holbach was that, as Kors writes, he "was an atheist, and he proselytized".

=== The Encyclopédie ===
Although the Encyclopédie (published 1751–1772) was driven and edited by the atheist Denis Diderot, the encyclopedia's articles on atheism and atheists take a negative tone, having been written by the pastor Jean-Henri-Samuel Formey and the abbé Claude Yvon. This was probably the most common conception of atheism by the public and by some of the "philosophes". Yvon identifies the main causes of atheism as ignorance and stupidity, and debauchery and the corruption of morals. The article "Athées" is primarily concerned with refuting Bayle's assertions, insisting that atheists "cannot have an exact and complete understanding of the morality of human actions".

=== Sylvain Maréchal ===
Sylvain Maréchal (1750-1803), a proto-utopian-socialist, bordering on anarchism, was also a staunch atheist. In his 1799 essay, Preliminary discourse, or Answer to the question: What is an atheist?, Maréchal proclaimed that he had no more need of God than God needed him, and proclaimed such an attitude was "true atheism" after rejecting several competing stances. He outright rejected the idea of masters ruling his life, and that included the will of any god. For him, to believe in God is to submit to hierarchy. He also wrote the Dictionnaire des athées anciens et modernes (Dictionary of Atheists, Ancient and Modern) in order to present atheism as a respectable philosophical tradition.

== Sources ==
- Bayle, Pierre (1826). An Historical and Critical Dictionary. London: Hunt and Clark.
- Bayle, Pierre (2000). Sally L. Jenkinson (ed.). Bayle – Political Writings. Cambridge: Cambridge University Press.
- Buckley, Michael J. (1987). At the Origins of Modern Atheism. London: Yale University Press.
- Champion, Justin. The Pillars of Priestcraft Shaken: The Church of England and its Enemies, 1660–1730. Cambridge: Cambridge University Press, 1992.
- Champion, Justin. "Toleration and Citizenship in Enlightenment England: John Toland and the Naturalization of the Jews, 1714–1753." In Toleration in Enlightenment Europe, edited by Ole Peter Grell and Roy Porter, 133–156. Cambridge: Cambridge University Press, 2000.
- Dupré, Louis. Religion and the Rise of Modern Culture. Notre Dama, Indiana: University of Notre Dame Press, 2008.
- Grell, Ole Peter and Roy Porter. "Toleration in Enlightenment Europe." In Toleration in Enlightenment Europe, edited by Ole Peter Grell and Roy Porter, 1–22. Cambridge: Cambridge University Press, 2000.
- Israel, Jonathan I. (1999). Locke, Spinoza and the Philosophical Debate Concerning Toleration in the Early Enlightenment (c. 1670 – c. 1750). Amsterdam: Koninklijke Nederlandse Akademie van Wetenschappen.
- Israel, Jonathan I. (2000). "Spinoza, Locke and the Enlightenment Battle for Toleration". In Ole Peter Grell; Roy Porter (eds.). Toleration in Enlightenment Europe. Cambridge: Cambridge University Press. pp. 102–113.
- Jacob, Margaret C. Living the Enlightenment: Freemasonry and Politics in Eighteenth-Century Europe. Oxford: Oxford University Press, 1991.
- Kors, Alan Charles. D'Holbach's Coterie: An Enlightenment in Paris. Princeton, New Jersey: Princeton University Press, 1976.
- Linton, Marisa. "Citizenship and Religious Toleration in France." In Toleration in Enlightenment Europe, edited by Ole Peter Grell and Roy Porter, 157–174. Cambridge: Cambridge University Press, 2000.
- Russell, Paul. "The Riddle of Hume's Treatise: Skepticism, Naturalism and Irreligion." New York: Oxford University Press, 2008.
- Tomaselli, Sylvana. "Intolerance, the Virtue of Princes and Radicals." In Toleration in Enlightenment Europe, edited by Ole Peter Grell and Roy Porter, 86–101. Cambridge: Cambridge University Press, 2000.
- Tuck, Richard (2003). "The 'Christian Atheism' of Thomas Hobbes". In Michael Hunter; David Wootton (eds.). Atheism from the Reformation to the Enlightenment. Oxford: Oxford University Press. pp. 111–130.
- Yvon, Claude (2008). "Athées". In Denis Diderot; Jean le Rond d'Alembert (eds.). Encyclopédie, ou dictionnaire raisonné des sciences, des arts et des métiers (Winter 2008 ed.). University of Chicago: ARTFL Encyclopédie Projet. Robert Morrissey (ed.)
- Yvon, Claude; Formey, Jean-Henri-Samuel (2008). "Atheisme". In Denis Diderot; Jean le Rond d'Alembert (eds.). Encyclopédie, ou dictionnaire raisonné des sciences, des arts et des métiers (Winter 2008 ed.). University of Chicago: ARTFL Encyclopédie Projet. Robert Morrissey (ed.)
