= D'Holbach's Coterie =

Group of French Enlightenment thinkers

D'Holbach's Coterie (La coterie holbachique was the French phrase coined by Jean-Jacques Rousseau) was a group of radical French Enlightenment thinkers who met regularly at the salon of the atheist philosophe Baron d'Holbach in the years approximately 1750–1780. An enormously wealthy man, the Baron used his wealth to maintain one of the more notable and lavish Parisian salons, which soon became an important meeting place for philosophers and their guests, and where Diderot recruited at least a few of the contributors to the Encyclopédie. Meetings were held regularly twice a week, on Sundays and Thursdays, in d'Holbach's home in rue Royale, butte Saint-Roche. Visitors to the salon were exclusively males, and the tone of discussion was both lively and quite philosophical, extending to topics more extensive and generally more candid and more earnest than those of other salons. Few subjects were taboo, and sharp disagreements were welcomed.

On every Thursday and Sunday, twelve guests—not always the same—would meet at the salon from two o'clock to seven or eight at night. Regulars at the salon included Diderot, Helvétius, d'Alembert, Raynal, Boulanger, Morellet, Saint-Lambert, Marmontel; and, occasionally, Buffon, Turgot, and Quesnay. Others who attended the salon included Rousseau, Abbé Galiani, Le Roy, Duclos, Venel, Barthez, Rouelle, Roux, and Suard. Foreigners in Paris would try to get an invitation to the salon due to its fame; in due course the salon was frequented by Hume, Sterne, Garrick, Horace Walpole, Franklin, Priestly, Smith, Beccaria, and Gibbon.
