= Nicolas La Grange =

French playwright and translator

Nicolas La Grange (1707–1775) was a French playwright and translator, notable for his 1768 translation of Lucretius' De Rerum Natura into French, and for several plays.

La Grange served as private tutor to the children of the French Enlightenment philosopher Baron d'Holbach and collaborated with Jacques-André Naigeon in translating the works of Seneca.

== Works (selection) ==
- 1758: Oeuvres de théâtre de M. de La Grange. Duchesne, Paris
- 1770: Le bon tuteur, et l'indolent. Libr. assoc., La Haye
- 1772: Les contre-temps: Comédie.
