= Charles Le Roy =

Charles Le Roy may refer to:

- Charles-Georges Le Roy (1723–1789), French man of letters during the Age of Enlightenment
- Charles Le Roy (physician) (1726–1779), French physician and Encyclopédiste
