= Christianity Unveiled =

18th-century book

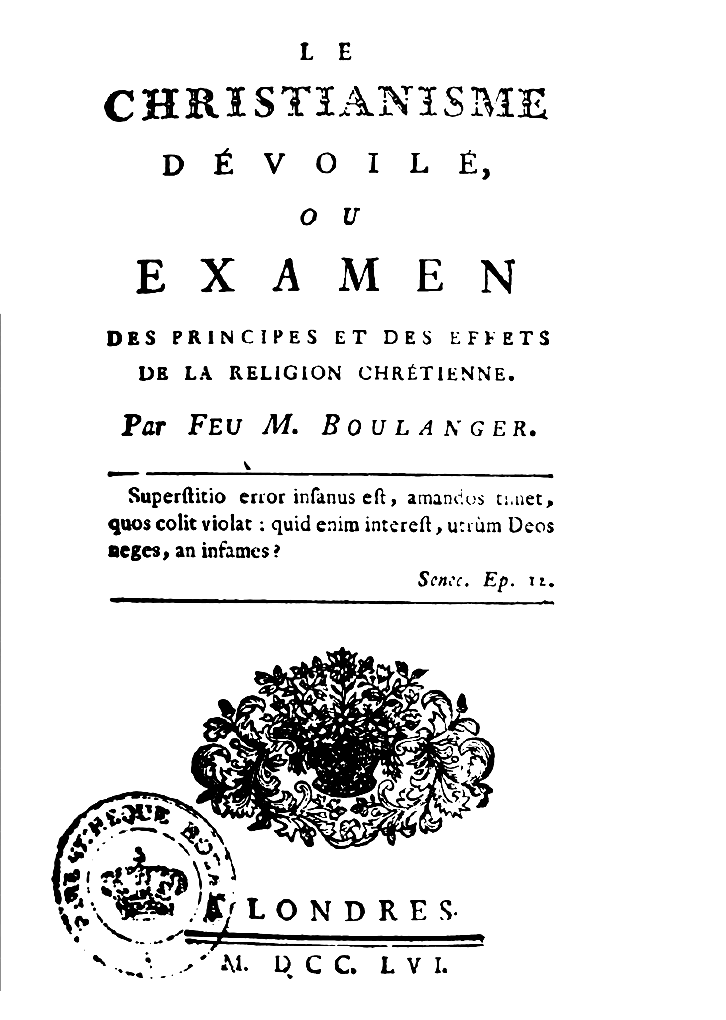
The original version of the book

Christianity Unveiled, or Examination of the Principles and Effects of the Christian Religion (Le christianisme dévoilé, ou Examen des principes et des effets de la religion chrétienne) is an anti-Christian book attributed to Baron d'Holbach, probably published in 1766 under a pseudonym in Nancy.

In his first religiously critical work, Holbach points out aspects of the Christian faith that he considers contradictory, and particularly criticizes the moral and political influence of the Christian religion and its clergy in harsh terms. The assertions presented find numerous parallels in Holbach's later works, yet contain only latent atheistic statements and primarily attack Christianity in contrast to religion in general.

Unlike earlier critical publications on religion, Le christianisme dévoilé does not contain an analysis of the historical origin of religions or the project of a deistic alternative religion, but openly presents itself as an anti-Christian propaganda script. The book provoked lively reactions in philosophical-Enlightenment circles and was immediately confiscated by the French authorities after its publication.

== Authorship ==
Le christianisme dévoilé was published under the name "the late M. Boulanger". Contemporaries doubted the authorship of Nicolas Antoine Boulanger, known for his posthumously published philosophical-historical works, and speculated about the true author. For example, Voltaire wrote in 1766 in a letter to the materialist Helvétius:

De qui est cet ouvrage attribué à Bolingbroke, à Boulanger, à Fréret ? Eh mes amis ! qu’importe l’auteur de l’ouvrage ?	Whose work might this be, attributed to Bolingbroke, Boulanger, or Fréret? My friends, what does it matter who the author of the work is?

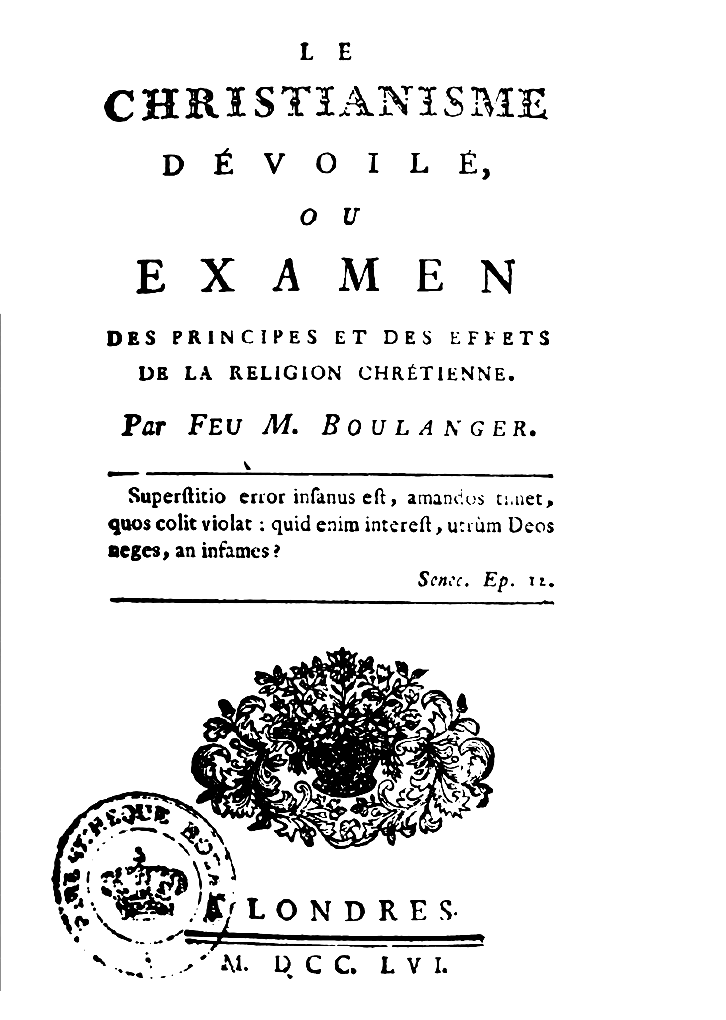
Title page of the earliest known, 295-page edition with "M. Boulanger" as the author, 1756 as the year of publication, and London as the place of publication. All these details are incorrect.

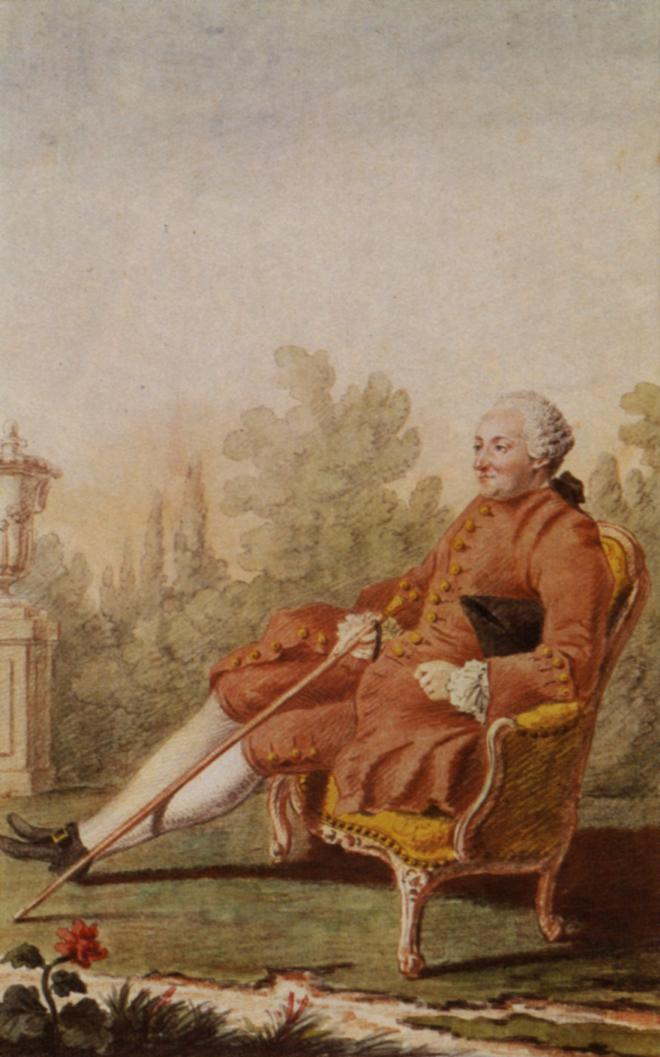
Baron d'Holbach in 1766, watercolor portrait by Louis Carmontelle

Voltaire, who also frequently used pseudonyms, was not exempt from these suspicions. In his 1768 correspondence, he names his recently deceased friend Étienne Noël Damilaville (1723–1768) as the author – likely to divert suspicion from himself.

The attribution to Boulanger is most likely due to the similarity of the title to his work L’antiquité dévoilée. Since the end of the 18th century, Le christianisme dévoilé has been included in several editions of Boulanger's works. The hypothesis of Damilaville as the author has also been occasionally expressed. The writer and critic Jean-François de La Harpe reported that Damilaville had partly dictated the text from Diderot. Damilaville had stored the books and sold them for 10 Écus per copy.

The librarian and bibliographer Antoine-Alexandre Barbier contradicts La Harpe's statements and asserts Holbach as the author. According to Barbier, the manuscript was entrusted to Jean-François de Saint-Lambert, who had it printed by the publisher Le Clerc in Nancy. Indiscretion by the publisher almost caused trouble for the book's author and its courier. From Nancy, the copies reached Ferney, where Voltaire had the first two copies sent to Damilaville. Officers then brought the books en masse to Paris.

Before Barbier, Sylvain Maréchal attributed the work to Holbach in his Dictionnaire des athées anciens et modernes. Holbach's authorship was confirmed two decades later by André Morellet.

A study of Holbach's characteristic stylistic features by Rudolf Besthorn revealed clear correspondences. The repetitions typical for Holbach and references to previous contexts are present, albeit not as extensively as in his 1770 published Système de la nature (System of Nature). The very similar thematic relationships to Holbach's verified works, which go as far as verbatim matches, confirm his authorship and rule out Boulanger, Voltaire, and Damilaville as authors from a stylistic and content perspective. Co-authorship by Diderot in the work cannot be proven. However, indirect statements by Diderot from 1762 suggest that Diderot and Helvétius were aware of these and other writings of Holbach's, and supported the author with advice.

== Dating ==
The earliest known edition of Le christianisme dévoilé states 1756 as the year of publication on the title page. This date is either incorrect or fabricated for the purpose of deception, as Nicolas-Antoine Boulanger, named as the deceased author, actually died three years later. The preface to the work is dated "May 4, 1758." Additionally, the book cites the work Recherches sur l’origine du despotisme oriental, which was not published until 1761.

Since the first print of the work does not reference any events after 1761, it is reasonable to date the publication of the work to this year. This assumption coincides with the date given in Barbier's Dictionnaire des ouvrages anonymes et pseudonymes. However, a first publication in the year 1766 is more likely, as only from this point onwards does the work suddenly receive frequent mention in philosophical correspondence and other documents. The later date is also supported by the fact that in the title page of a copy from the Bibliothèque nationale, the date of MDCCLVI (1756) was corrected to MDCCLXVI (1766) by the later addition of an “X” (10). An examination of the earliest known edition also reveals that the watermarks on the paper are dated 1762 or 1763.

The manuscript could not have been completed before 1762, as Boulanger's cited work, Recherches sur l’origine du despotisme oriental, is first mentioned in January 1762. On the other hand, it is noticeable that Boulanger's other remaining work, L’antiquité dévoilée, is not mentioned at all. This work was announced as being in print in November 1765. It can be concluded that the manuscript of Le christianisme dévoilé was completed between 1762 and the end of 1765 and published in 1766.

== Structure ==
The work begins with a preface in the form of a response to a supposed letter from a reader, which already anticipates the main points of the work. Following the introduction on the necessity of subjecting religion to critical examination, the first two chapters provide an overview of the history of Judaism and Christianity. This is followed by a detailed treatment and criticism of the tenets of Christianity. Holbach then elaborately discusses Christian morality; the chapter on Christian virtues is the longest in the entire work. After a chapter on religious duties and actions, there is a presentation of the political effects of religion and the priesthood. The concluding remarks summarize the core ideas of the text and discuss, in particular, the tasks of the enlightened ruler.

Holbach brings forth a wide array of diverse objections to Christianity in his text. His arguments from the realm of practical philosophy include moral concerns about the God of the Bible, action theoretical considerations, objections to Christian morality and virtues, as well as some critical arguments from the field of political philosophy. From the standpoint of theoretical philosophy, Holbach criticizes the flawed terminology of Christian faith regarding the alleged properties of God and also presents language philosophical and epistemological considerations.

Although the book was aimed at an averagely educated readership, which was to be quickly convinced, Holbach cited numerous sources in his footnotes. In addition to works of historiography, various works critical of religion are quoted, including those by Jean Meslier, Peter Annet (1693–1769), Thomas Woolston (1668–1733), and Anthony Collins. The content presented in Le christianisme dévoilé is largely traceable in other contemporary writings. What is new is the compilation in the form of a potent overall presentation, which disregards tactical political considerations.

Chapter Overview
Chapter 1	Introduction. De la nécessité d’examiner sa religion, et des obstacles que l’on rencontre dans cet examen.	Introduction. On the necessity of examining one's religion, and the obstacles encountered in this examination.
Chapter 2	Histoire abrégée du peuple juif.	A brief history of the Jewish people.
Chapter 3	Histoire abrégée du christianisme.	A brief history of Christianity.
Chapter 4	De la mythologie chrétienne, ou des idées que le christianisme nous donne de Dieu et de sa conduite.	On Christian mythology, or the ideas Christianity gives us about God and His conduct.
Chapter 5	De la révélation.	On revelation.
Chapter 6	Des preuves de la religion chrétienne; des miracles; des prophéties; des martyrs.	On the proofs of the Christian religion; miracles; prophecies; martyrs.
Chapter 7	Des mystères de la religion chrétienne.	On the mysteries of the Christian religion.
Chapter 8	Autres mystères et dogmes du christianisme.	Other mysteries and dogmas of Christianity.
Chapter 9	Des rites, des cérémonies mystérieuses, ou de la théurgie des chrétiens.	On the rites and mysterious ceremonies, or the Theurgy of Christians.
Chapter 10	Des livres sacrés des chrétiens.	On the sacred books of Christians.
Chapter 11	De la morale chrétienne.	On Christian morality.
Chapter 12	Des vertus chrétiennes.	On Christian virtues.
Chapter 13	Des pratiques et des devoirs de la religion chrétienne.	On the practices and duties of the Christian religion.
Chapter 14	Des effets politiques de la religion chrétienne.	On the political effects of the Christian religion.
Chapter 15	De l’église, ou du sacerdoce des chrétiens.	On the church, or the priesthood of Christians.
Chapter 16	Conclusion.	Conclusion.

== Content ==
=== Preface and Introduction ===
In the preface, Holbach responds to the supposed letter of a reader who, on one hand, agrees with the criticism of Christian beliefs, but on the other hand, argues that the common people need a religion, as otherwise, nothing would prevent them from committing crimes. Holbach counters that it is not religion, but laws that restrain the people, and thus questions the critic whether he belongs to those "faint-hearted thinkers" who "believe that truth can be harmful". Everything suggests that the preface is addressed to Voltaire, aiming to preemptively counter his predictable objections to the book's content.

In the introduction, Holbach makes it clear that the worship of a god should not be justified by the expected reward or punishment from this god. Instead, humans should apply reason to understand the causes of their desires and fears, and only a few are willing to do so. Individuals, whether poor or rich, cling to faith only because they have been raised and educated that way from childhood; in this way, religious views have been able to persist for centuries:

Le plus sûr moyen de tromper les hommes et de perpétuer leurs préjugés, c’est de les tromper dans l’enfance. Chez presque tous les peuples modernes, l’éducation ne semble avoir pour objet que de former des fanatiques, des dévots, des moines; c’est-à-dire des hommes nuisibles ou inutiles à la société.	The surest means to mislead people and maintain their prejudices is to deceive them in childhood. Among nearly all modern peoples, education seems to serve only to produce fanatics, pious people, and monks, that is, individuals harmful or useless to society.

Since the Christian religion attributes a role model function to its god, described as cruel and malicious, it has only brought hatred, discord, and violence to the people. Even kings and rulers have gained nothing from Christianity, as they had to repeatedly submit to the priesthood. Therefore, it is all the more important to lift the veil of Christianity and explore its principles.

=== History and Origin of Judeo-Christian Religions (Chapters 2 and 3) ===
The history of the Jewish and Christian religion is briefly and dryly described by the author; the goal pursued by Fontenelle (De l’origine des fables) and Boulanger (L’antiquité dévoilée) of revealing the human-psychological causes of religious beliefs is only marginally of interest to him. Holbach portrays the origin of the "Jewish people" – "in a small area, hardly noticed by other nations" – as distinctly mundane and insignificant, to deny it any credibility. To the already unpropitious situation of this people, their superstition and ignorance are added. Moses turned the Hebrews into "possessed and wild monsters" who hated other gods and, as reported in the 1st Book of Kings, acted barbarically against other nations. As slaves to various peoples, the Jews – always victims of their gullibility – were harshly and "deservedly" treated, before becoming even more fanatical under Roman domination. These were the circumstances, according to Holbach's anti-Semitic portrayal of the Old Testament, under which the Jewish people expected their Messiah.

The origin of Christianity is described in a similarly sober and sometimes sarcastic tone. A poor Jew suddenly appeared who convinced an ignorant following that he was the Son of God, and who was eventually executed by other Jews. Holbach emphasizes the Egyptian, Phoenician, Platonic and other influences of the new "crude and disjointed" religion – a theme that is repeatedly addressed in the following chapters. Initially, only the poor among the Jews and pagans felt addressed by a god hostile to the rich and powerful. Only the Roman emperors, who reluctantly converted to Christianity, helped the church to independence and eventually to dominance. The contrast between the charity preached by Christians and their fanatical cruelty is explained by the adoption of the Jewish god, whose terrible nature was further intensified by the concept of eternal damnation.

=== Revelations and Beliefs of Christianity (Chapters 4–8) ===
Holbach tries to distinguish between facts and religious myths; only after the historically oriented presentation of the previous chapters does the work deal with the revelation. From the beginning, the author attempts to demonstrate the absurdity of Christian beliefs, starting with a mocking portrayal of the biblical creation myth: "Hardly has this Adam seen the light of the world, when his creator sets a trap for him..."; similarly absurd is the atonement of Jesus Christ. A morality based on such an arbitrarily acting god must be insecure. The question of how the evil in the world can be reconciled with the alleged goodness of God (Theodicy problem) cannot be answered by the existence of a devil or by the inexplicability of God's actions:

On nous dira sans doute que la conduite de Dieu est pour nous un mystère impénétrable, que nous ne sommes point en droit de l’examiner, que notre faible raison se perdrait toutes les fois qu’elle voudrait sonder les profondeurs de la sagesse divine, qu’il faut l’adorer en silence et nous soumettre en tremblant aux oracles d’un dieu qui a lui-même fait connaître ses volontés : on nous ferme la bouche en nous disant que la divinité s’est révélée aux hommes.	We will undoubtedly be told that God's conduct is an impenetrable mystery to us, that we are not entitled to examine it; that our weak reason would lose itself whenever it tries to delve into the depths of divine wisdom, that we must adore in silence and submit tremblingly to the edicts of a god who has himself expressed his will: We are silenced by being told that divinity has revealed itself to humans.

To have a conception of God, one cannot rely on revelation, as it cannot prove its own correctness. Doubts about its statements cannot be dismissed with the argument that they are Mysteries, because an all-good god would express himself clearly to everyone. This is obviously not the case, as everyone interprets the Bible differently, theologians included. In fact, Christianity offers no advantage over any other "superstition that pollutes the universe," such as belief in Brahma or Odin. There are no serious evidences for miracles; they were only invented to convince people of the impossible. The vague prophecies of the Old Testament have been fulfilled through forced interpretations and allegories. Martyrs prove nothing either, as not only fanaticism, but all emotions have had their martyrs.

Holbach questions how attributes like Infinity, Eternity, Omnipotence, or Justice are compatible with the God of the Bible. The Trinity can only be biblically justified through forced explanations; the doctrines of the Incarnation and Resurrection are obviously borrowed from other religions. The concept of Hell is not only incompatible with a benevolent god, but also serves to subjugate people and cloud their reason. Furthermore, it is not the belief in heaven and hell that prevents people from unrestrained behavior, but good laws and sensible education. Angels, according to Holbach, are in the imagination of Christians what Nymphs, Lares, and Fairies are in the minds of pagans and Romans. Again, he emphasizes parallels to other belief systems: The belief in Satan comes from earlier religions, the concept of Purgatory from Plato.

=== Religious Practice and Holy Scripture (Chapters 9 and 10) ===
After discussing the central Christian beliefs, Holbach briefly addresses the "childish and ridiculous ceremonies" of Christians. He describes Baptism as a "mystery impenetrable to reason, whose effectiveness has been empirically refuted," since sins are apparently still committed after baptism. The same applies to the Transubstantiation (transformation of bread and wine into the body and blood of Jesus Christ), Confession, Prayer, and Exorcism: "all mystery, all magic, all incomprehensible." He then briefly discusses the contents of the holy books. Contrary to the biblical exegesis of some modern theologians, who interpret certain passages of scripture symbolically, Holbach took the statements of the Bible literally. He argues that the beginning of the Bible demonstrates a "profound ignorance of the laws of physics" and is full of contradictions. The entire Old Testament is a "clumsy collection interspersed with obscure and disjointed revelations." Holbach finds the New Testament hardly more credible, pointing to several places where the Gospels contradict each other. Given such a book, it is not surprising that Christians have repeatedly argued over what their God wants from them:

Ainsi ce livre obscur fut pour eux une pomme de discorde, une source intarissable de querelles, un arsenal, dans lequel les partis les plus opposés se pourvurent également d’armes. Les géomètres n’ont aucune dispute sur les principes fondamentaux de leur science; par quelle fatalité le livre révélé des chrétiens, qui renferme les fondements de leur religion divine, d’où dépend leur félicité éternelle, est-il inintelligible et sujet à des disputes qui si souvent ont ensanglanté la terre ?	And so this obscure book became for them an apple of discord, an inexhaustible source of quarrels, an arsenal from which the most opposing groups also armed themselves. Geometers do not argue about the fundamental principles of their science; why then is the revealed book of the Christians, containing the foundations of their divine religion, unintelligible and subject to disputes that have so often bloodied the earth?

=== Christian Morality and Virtues (Chapters 11–13) ===
Holbach rejects the notion that morality is impossible without supernatural revelation. In reality, morality has always existed as a necessary part of society. Thinkers of pre-Christian societies – Socrates, Confucius, or the Gymnosophists – were in no way inferior to Jesus Christ and refuted the Christian monopoly claim on values such as justice, patriotism, patience, or gentleness. Far from sanctifying these values, Christianity makes them uncertain, as a capricious God cannot serve as a solid ethical foundation. Since fanatics have always been more deeply impressed by the notion of a cruel God than a benevolent one, Christianity has been responsible for more bloodshed than any pagan superstition. Secular rulers too have suffered under the whimsical moral notions of Christians. Instead of forbidding crimes in the name of God, a "natural morality" should be taught, pointing to human self-preservation and their place in society.

The Christian virtues are described by Holbach as little suited for humans. The Love of an unjust and terrifying God is hardly possible and, if followed, is accompanied by zeal: "A true Christian must become enraged when God is sinned against". From this perspective, the missions and the associated violence are understandable. When tender-hearted people feel a romantic devotion to God, they only see him from his kind side and overlook his unpleasant qualities. Neighborly love or love of enemies is unrealistic, as one can only love another person if one knows them and they contribute to one's happiness. Faith has only been elevated to virtue to prevent reason-based thinking and maintain trust in Christian officials. Blinded by the Hope of eternal life, believers lose sight of present happiness; the Catholic virtue of Modesty degrades humans and robs them of their drive for action. With similar sharp Anticlericalism, celibacy and the prohibition of divorce are criticized. In Holbach's overall view, no true morality is compatible with the Christian religion:

Toutes les vertus que le christianisme admire, ou sont outrées et fanatiques, ou elles ne tendent qu’à rendre l’homme timide, abject et malheureux. Si elles lui donnent du courage, il devient bientôt opiniâtre, altier, cruel et nuisible à la société.	All the virtues that Christianity admires are either exaggerated and fanatical, or they are aimed only at making man timid, base, and unhappy. If they give him courage, he soon becomes bitter, arrogant, cruel, and detrimental to society.

Prayer is also absurd, as it contradicts the claimed immutability of God; in other words, prayer presupposes a capricious God. Religious holidays lead to necessary work being unnecessarily halted. Like hardly any other cult, Christianity makes its followers dependent on the priesthood through baptism, confession, and the threat of Excommunication. Instead of forming a useful, enlightened citizen, people are from the outset inoculated with prejudice, which always serves only the priests.

=== Political and Societal Influence of the Clergy (Chapters 14 and 15) ===
Following the contemplations on Christian Ethics, the political consequences of Christianity are examined. Holbach observes that in all Christian countries, two opposing legal systems arise that fight each other; the Church creates a "state within a state". Due to the inevitable discord between Christian denominations, between Orthodox and Heretics, politics have always had to intervene. The Church has always sought to manipulate princes and rulers in its favor. This leads to a tyranny under which the scientific, economic, cultural, and social life of the state comes to a halt. An enlightened and just ruler, who seriously cares for the well-being of his "subjects", does not need to promote superstition.

For Holbach, the tyrannical claim to power of the Church is due to the Christian doctrine, which is based on the infallible divine authority. In a historical overview, he further explains that the wealth built up by the early bishops led to discord and power struggles among the clergy, until the Bishop of Rome eventually ascended the throne and established a Theocracy. Ultimately, the Catholic religion was invented only to secure the power of the priesthood, and even the Reformation was a failed endeavor that could not free itself from superstition. A Christian society is responsible for the evils inflicted by the priesthood.

=== Conclusion (Chapter 16) ===
The conclusion of Christianisme dévoilé is primarily addressed to rulers, which was common for works of that time. Holbach makes it clear that it is in the interest of political officeholders to detach themselves from the Christian religion and its clergy. His definition of religion from a political perspective is similar to Marx's theses critical of religion:

La religion est l’art d’enivrer les hommes de l’enthousiasme, pour les empêcher de s’occuper des maux, dont ceux qui les gouvernent, les accablent ici bas.	Religion is the art of intoxicating men with enthusiasm, to prevent them from dealing with the earthly evils with which those who govern them overwhelm them.

It is the task of the enlightened ruler, and not of the Church, to teach morals and administer justice. Even if Christianity prevents some people from committing crimes – which is doubted – these benefits are nothing compared to the immense damage this religion has caused. Unlike Voltaire, who directed his enlightenment program at the educated classes, Holbach called for public education that includes all people regardless of their origin.

With a quasi-religious appeal, Holbach concludes optimistically that rulers have nothing to fear from an enlightened people, and that ultimately truth and reason would triumph. Although Holbach, like Voltaire, ultimately pins his hopes on an enlightened monarch, he moves away from Voltaire's plan to win rulers over to the side of enlightenment through tactical maneuvers.

== Seizure and persecution ==
On September 1, 1766, the Paris police chief Sartine noted the distribution of the book in the capital and commissioned Joseph d’Hémery to prevent its distribution by all means.

In the spring of 1767, 200 copies of the book were confiscated at a “Madame Le Jeune”. In 1768, it was recorded that a certain Bacot offered the work for sale. The peddler Lefèvre, who in 1768 owned copies of Le christianisme dévoilé among a whole series of philosophical new releases, was arrested and convicted multiple times. In October 1768, the police arrested the sales assistant Josserand, the peddler Lecuyer and his wife for selling books "contrary to good morals and religion," including Le christianisme dévoilé. The case confirms that the book was received with interest even in the lower classes. All three were sentenced to three days of pillory, Josserand to branding and nine years of galley, Lecuyer to branding and five years of galley, and his wife to five years in a reformatory. Despite Lecuyer's numerous previous convictions, this punishment was unusually severe and caused dismay in philosophical circles.

Le christianisme dévoilé is among the books that the clergy condemned at their general assemblies (Assemblées du clergé) in the years 1770 and 1775. In August 1770, several books and pamphlets were condemned to be burned by court order, including copies of Holbach's work.

== Editions ==
According to the copy dated 1756, the work experienced five new editions in 1767, including possibly some foreign prints. For the 18th and 19th centuries, twelve more French-language editions of the work are documented; the temporarily last one dates from 1834. Partly, Le christianisme dévoilé was included in supposed complete editions of Boulanger's work. Among the publishers identified from existing invoices was Marc-Michel Rey from Amsterdam, who became the most important publisher of the French Enlightenment from the mid-18th century.

The first English translation by the American William Martin Johnson was printed in New York in 1795. The first Spanish translation appeared in 1821, the first Russian in 1924. The so far only German translation was published in 1970 together with two other works by Holbach, edited by Manfred Naumann.

== Reception ==
The first edition of the book apparently sold out quickly or its distribution was severely limited due to persecution by the authorities, because the Mémoires secrets published under Bachaumont's name in 1766 describe the book as “a recently printed and very rare work”. In contrast, five new editions alone appeared in 1767, which, together with the high price of the book – according to Diderot up to four Louis per copy – testify to its success with the French public. Nevertheless, the work did not come close to the impact of the later Système de la nature, which marked the provisional peak of the atheistic-materialistic movement.

=== Reactions from Holbach's Intellectual Circle ===
In a letter dated September 24, 1766, to Damilaville, Voltaire praises the content of the book. He not only congratulates the author but also expresses his appreciation:

Il y a un nouveau livre, comme vous savez, de feu m. Boulanger. Ce Boulanger pétrissait une pâte que tous les estomacs ne pourraient pas digérer. Il y a quelques endroits où la pâte est un peu aigre; mais en général son pain est ferme et nourissant [sic] […] Mes compliments à l’auteur voilé du dévoilé. Je l’embrasse mille fois. Ecr. l’inf.	As you know, there is a new book by the late Mr. Boulanger. This Boulanger [Boulanger: Fr. "Baker"] kneaded a dough that not every stomach could digest. In some places, the dough is a bit sour; but overall, his bread is firm and nourishing. […] My compliments to the veiled author of the unveiled. I embrace him a thousand times. Crush the inf.

A few weeks later, Diderot reports in a letter to Voltaire about a newly published book, which is probably Le christianisme dévoilé. He fears that the work will provoke arbitrary suppression measures by the authorities and praises the author's courage with the following words:

« C’est un homme qui a pris la torche de vos mains, qui est entré fièrement dans leur édifice de paille, et qui a mis le feu de tous les côtés. »	He is a man who took the torch from your hands, proudly entered their straw building, and set it on fire from all sides.

Holbach himself commented briefly on his work in a letter to his friend, the lawyer Servan, stating that it had caused a “tremendous and well-deserved sensation”. Otherwise, Holbach remained in the background and referred only rarely to his first work in later writings.

Unlike Voltaire's challenges to the Catholic Church, his assessment of the work soon turned negative:

J’avoue avec vous qu’il a de la clarté, de la chaleur, et quelque-fois de l’éloquence, mais il est plein de répétitions, de négligences, de fautes contre la langue […] Il est entièrement opposé à mes principes. Ce livre conduit à l’athéisme que je déteste. J’ai toujours regardé l’athéisme comme le plus grand égarement de la raison, parce qu’il est aussi ridicule de dire que l’arrangement du monde ne prouve pas un artisan suprême, qu’il serait impertinent de dire qu’une horloge ne prouve pas un horloger. L’auteur parait trop ennemi des puissances. Des hommes qui penseraient comme lui ne formeraient qu’une anarchie […]	I agree with you that it has clarity, warmth, and sometimes eloquence, but it is full of repetitions, negligences, and errors against the language […] It is entirely opposed to my principles. This book leads to atheism, which I detest. I have always seen atheism as the greatest misguidance of reason because it is as ridiculous to say that the arrangement of the world does not prove a supreme craftsman, as it would be impertinent to say that a clock does not imply a clockmaker. The author seems too hostile to powers. Men who thought like him would only form an anarchy […]

Voltaire's critical annotations, which he noted in his copy of the book, have been preserved. They leave no doubt that he was disturbed by the appearance of the work, anticipating his rejection of Holbach's explicitly atheistic Système de la nature. This reaction highlights the split between Voltaire and the more radical philosophers Diderot and Holbach, who, unlike Voltaire, rejected both the moral utility of belief in God and a strategic alliance between Enlightenment thinkers and the ruling political powers.

=== Additional Contemporary Reviews ===
The German diplomat and writer Friedrich Melchior Grimm, a long-time participant in the philosophical dinners organized at Holbach's house, described in his review Le christianisme dévoilé as the "boldest and most terrifying book ever to appear anywhere in the world". He pointed out that although nothing new can be learned from the book, it still arouses interest.

In contrast, German public opinion received the work very negatively. The Göttingschen Gelehrten Anzeigen wrote that the book was "full of mockery, mostly indecent mockery, also crude insults; and written throughout more in the style of a Pasquinade than a serious dispute". Johann Christoph von Zabuesnig commented on the book as follows:

"The whole 'unveiled Christianity' is a godless collection of absurdities, blasphemies, curses, and just as tasteless as offensive conclusions of reason. It is dominated by a dark and melancholic spirit of fanaticism, which wants to destroy all religion. […] Such a bizarre monstrosity could only be generated in a heated head. […] Nevertheless, this work has been received with approval; but only by those kinds of people who prefer to be completely blinded by the works of a mad godlessness rather than to enlighten their minds through sensible writings; by those kinds of people who only praise a rebel because they too are guilty of the rebellion."

=== Apologetic Responses ===
The theologian Nicolas-Sylvestre Bergier published in 1769 as a response to Holbach's work the two-volume Apologie de la religion chrétienne, contre l’auteur du Christianisme dévoilé et contre quelques autres critiques, which is held in the traditional style of Catholic Apologetics.

Referring to Thomas Aquinas, Bergier reaffirms his confidence in reason. It is silly to claim that Christianity forbids reason; it is present at every level. Regarding revelation, reason itself understands that its contents must be believed without further examination. That this revelation is not "heard" by all people equally is due to the infinite and inexplicable nature of God.

By attacking religious tyranny in Le christianisme dévoilé, the author is preparing the way for that of secular laws, for without religion, these would necessarily have to be much stricter. The attempt to persuade rulers to introduce Freedom of Thought is doomed to failure, as non-Christian peoples lag far behind Christian ones. It is also wrong to say that Christianity incites people to rebellions, as there have always been rebellions. Even if Christianity were unnecessary, it should be maintained, otherwise it would be replaced by a worse religion.

Bergier repeatedly accuses the author of misrepresenting the Christian faith to make it appear as unbearable as possible. For example, Holbach errs when he says that the Christian God foresees hellish torments for the majority of people:

Dieu ne punit point l’ignorance involontaire; il ne damnera aucun homme, pour avoir ignoré l’Evangile, à moins que cet homme n’ait eu des moyens de la connoître.	God does not punish involuntary ignorance; He will not damn any man for being ignorant of the Gospel, unless that man had the means to know it.

Another slander is the claim that eternal life is reserved for only a small number of the chosen, for according to the holy books, heavenly happiness is a reward for good deeds, especially charity. When considering the Theodicy issue, Bergier partly relies on Pierre Bayle's statement that an "infinite expanse" separates God's actions from those of men. Man must show kindness to his fellow men because his power is limited; it is absurd to expect the same from the almighty God.

Behind the attention given to Holbach's later Système de la nature in Apologetics, Le christianisme dévoilé was less noticed. Nevertheless, it was often briefly quoted in the years following its publication, such as by the Protestant Jacob Vernes, the Catholic Jean-René Sigaud de la Fond, the Jesuit Claude-Adrien Nonnotte, the Benedictine Louis-Maïeul Chaudon and the Enlightenment opponent Antoine Sabatier de Castres.

=== Further Influence and Modern Reception ===
The Young Hegelian Bruno Bauer took the title of his 1843 religious critique early work Das entdeckte Christentum (The Discovered Christianity) from Le christianisme dévoilé (Christianity Unveiled). Bauer frequently cites Holbach's works in it.

In 2009, Wulf Kellerwessel published a detailed examination of the work's statements in the journal Enlightenment and Critique, assessing the strength of Holbach's arguments as very uneven. Less convincing are Holbach's “psychological” and personal objections; for example, it is empirically doubtful whether the love towards the God of the Bible, as claimed by Holbach, is indeed psychologically impossible. Also, the criticism of colonization and forced missionary work as a result of Christian moral concepts is largely outdated. However, Holbach's references to linguistic philosophical and logical inconsistencies, which would pose serious problems for Christianity as well as other monotheistic religions, are more convincing. Kellerwessel summarizes his impressions as follows:

"Thus, the Enlightenment analyses in 'The Unveiled Christianity' prove to be at least in relevant parts rational penetrations of problematic faith contents, and are therefore still current as relevant critiques of certain religious beliefs today."[sic]

Holbach's timeless claim to expose religious beliefs as prejudices makes the text "still readable and interesting today."

== Bibliography ==
Modern Editions

- Le christianisme dévoilé, ou Examen des principes et des effets de la religion chrétienne. (Christianity Unveiled, or Examination of the Principles and Effects of the Christian Religion.) Coda, Paris 2006, ISBN 2-84967-032-4
- Das entschleierte Christentum, oder Prüfung der Prinzipien und Wirkungen der christlichen Religion. (The Unveiled Christianity, or Examination of the Principles and Effects of the Christian Religion.) In Manfred Naumann (Ed.); Rosemarie Heise, Fritz-Georg Voigt (Trans.): Paul Thiry d’Holbach: Critical Writings on Religion, pp. 51–171. Aufbau-Verlag, Berlin 1970

Secondary Bibliography

- Rudolf Besthorn: Textual Studies on Holbach's Work, pp. 76–91. Rütten & Loening, Berlin 1969
- Wulf Kellerwessel: On the Critique of Religion in Baron von Holbach's 'The Unveiled Christianity'. Enlightenment and Critique 16, 1 (2009): 180–199, ISSN 0945-6627
- Denis Lecompte: Baron d’Holbach and Karl Marx: From Anti-Christianity to a Primary and Radical Atheism, pp. 328–460 (Vol. 1); 631–638, 663–698 (Vol. 2). Dissertation, University Paris IV, 1980. Cerf, Paris 1984, ISBN 2-204-02207-1
- Manfred Naumann: On the Publication History of 'Christianisme dévoilé'. In Werner Krauss / Walter Dietze (Eds.): New Contributions to Enlightenment Literature, pp. 155–183. Rütten & Loening, Berlin 1964
- Jeroom Vercruysse: Descriptive Bibliography of the Writings of Baron d’Holbach. Minard, Paris 1971
