= Augustin Roux =

Augustin Roux (French: [ʁu]; 26 January 1726 – 28 June 1776) was a French medical doctor, encyclopedist and man of letters during the Age of Enlightenment.

Roux was born in Bordeaux, where he studied medicine. He received his doctorate in 1750 and then came to Paris where, on the recommendation of Montesquieu, he was able to obtain the financial support that his family had refused him as punishment for not pursuing an ecclesiastical career.

After learning English, Roux translated several English books into French, taught a course of medicine and worked as doctor at the Faculty of Medicine in Paris. He succeeded Vandermonde as editor of the Journal of Medicine in 1762.

His extensive knowledge of chemistry resulted in his appointment as professor of science at the Faculty in 1771.

Roux regularly attended the salon of Baron d'Holbach. He died on September 1, 1776 in Paris.

== Bibliography ==
- Pierre Larousse, Grand Dictionnaire universel du XIXe siècle, vol. 13, Paris, Administration du grand Dictionnaire universel, p. 1477.
