= Charles-Georges Le Roy =

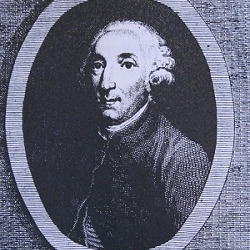
Charles-Georges Le Roy

Charles-Georges Le Roy or Leroy (French pronunciation: [ʃaʁl ʒɔʁʒ lə ʁwa]; 22 July 1723, Paris – 11 November 1789, Paris) was a French man of letters during the Age of Enlightenment and the author of one of the first books on human behaviour.

Le Roy was a lieutenant of the royal hunt and a friend of the Encyclopedists Diderot, d'Alembert and d'Holbach, regularly attending d'Holbach's salon.

Le Roy's publications began as texts on the behaviour and sensitivity of animals, published under the pseudonym of "the physician of Nuremberg." These appeared in the Encyclopédie méthodique in 1793.

Le Roy was an early advocate of the inheritance of acquired characteristics.
