= 7346 Boulanger =

Koronian asteroid from the outer regions of the asteroid belt

Discovery
- Discovered by: E. W. Elst
- Discovery site: CERGA Obs.
- Discovery date: 20 February 1993

Designations
- Named after: Nicolas Boulanger (French naturalist)
- Alternative designations: 1993 DQ_{2} · 1981 UC_{16} 1986 TK_{5} · 1986 TX_{10} 1990 RN_{18}
- Minor planet category: main-belt · (outer); Koronis

Orbital characteristics
- Epoch 23 March 2018 (JD 2458200.5)
- Uncertainty parameter 0
- Observation arc: 63.01 yr (23,016 d)
- Aphelion: 3.1060 AU
- Perihelion: 2.6453 AU
- Semi-major axis: 2.8757 AU
- Eccentricity: 0.0801
- Orbital period (sidereal): 4.88 yr (1,781 d)
- Mean anomaly: 169.09°
- Mean motion: 0° 12^{m} 7.56^{s} / day
- Inclination: 3.1808°
- Longitude of ascending node: 119.00°
- Argument of perihelion: 254.01°

Physical characteristics
- Mean diameter: 7.378±0.081 km
- Geometric albedo: 0.270±0.066
- Spectral type: S (SDSS-MOC)
- Absolute magnitude (H): 12.8

7346 Boulanger, provisional designation 1993 DQ_{2}, is a Koronian asteroid from the outer regions of the asteroid belt, approximately 7.4 kilometers (4.6 miles) in diameter. It was discovered on 20 February 1993, by Belgian astronomer Eric Elst at the CERGA Observatory in Caussols, southeastern France. It was named after French Enlightenment philosopher Nicolas Boulanger.

== Orbit and classification ==
Boulanger is a member of the Koronis family (605), a very large outer asteroid family with nearly co-planar ecliptical orbits. It orbits the Sun in the outer main-belt at a distance of 2.6–3.1 AU once every 4 years and 11 months (1,781 days; semi-major axis of 2.88 AU). Its orbit has an eccentricity of 0.08 and an inclination of 3° with respect to the ecliptic.

The body's observation arc begins with a precovery taken at Palomar Observatory in April 1955, nearly 38 years prior to its official discovery observation at Caussols.

== Physical characteristics ==
In the SDSS-based taxonomy, Boulanger is a common, stony S-type asteroid, which agrees with the overall spectral type for Koronian asteroids. It has an absolute magnitude of 12.8. As of 2018, no rotational lightcurve of Boulanger has been obtained from photometric observations. The body's rotation period, pole and shape remain unknown.

=== Diameter and albedo ===
According to the survey carried out by the NEOWISE mission of NASA's Wide-field Infrared Survey Explorer, Boulanger measures 7.378 kilometers in diameter and its surface has an albedo of 0.270.

== Naming ==
This minor planet was named after Enlightenment philosopher and geologist Nicolas Antoine Boulanger (1722–1759). The official naming citation was published by the Minor Planet Center on 24 June 2002 (M.P.C. 46008).
