= Nicolas Antoine Boulanger =

French philosopher (1722–1759)

Nicolas Antoine Boulanger (French pronunciation: [nikɔla ɑ̃twan bulɑ̃ʒe]; 11 November 1722, in Paris – 16 September 1759, in Paris) was a French philosopher and man of letters during the Age of Enlightenment.

== Biography ==
Born the son of a paper merchant in Paris, Boulanger studied first mathematics, and later ancient languages. He composed several philosophical works in which he sought to come up with naturalistic explanations for superstitions and religious practices, all of which were published posthumously. His major works were Research into the Origins of Oriental Despotism («Recherches sur l’origine du despotisme oriental», 1761) and Antiquity Unveiled («L’Antiquité dévoilée par ses usages», 1766). Boulanger's collected works were published in 1792.

The German-born Baron d'Holbach (Paul-Henri Thiry, 1723–1789) published his controversial anti-religious work Christianity Unveiled («Christianisme dévoilé», 1761), using Boulanger's name as his pseudonym, just two years after the philosopher's death. Boulanger also was one of the first modern critics of Saint Paul.

== Honours ==
The Koronian asteroid 7346 Boulanger, discovered in 1993, was named in his honor.
