= Marisa Linton =

Marisa Linton is an author, historian, and member of the academic staff at Kingston University in London, where she is Professor Emerita in History. Having received her BA from Middlesex University in 1988 and PhD from University of Sussex in 1993, she specializes in the history of the French Revolution.

She has recently published two works of fiction, the young adult novel The Binding Spell (2025), and an adult novel following the adventures of a female detective investigating an occult mystery in Circle of Shadows (2025).

Her non-fiction titles include The Politics of Virtue in Enlightenment France (2001), Conspiracy in the French Revolution (2008), and Choosing Terror: Virtue, Friendship and Authenticity in the French Revolution (2013).
