= Jacques-André Naigeon =

French artist, atheist–materialist philosopher, editor and man of letters

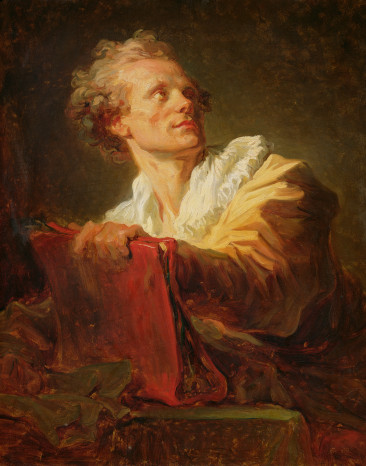
A Portrait of a Young Artist by Jean-Honoré Fragonard, presumed to be of Jacques-André Naigeon

Jacques-André Naigeon (15 July 1738, Paris – 28 February 1810, Paris) was a French artist, atheist-materialist philosopher, editor and man of letters best known for his contributions to the Encyclopédie and for reworking Baron d'Holbach's and Diderot's manuscripts.

== Biography ==
After trying his hand at painting and sculpture, Naigeon became a friend and associate of Denis Diderot, whom he helped to work on the Encyclopédie. He soon became involved with the Coterie Holbachique, a group of radical French Enlightenment thinkers centered on the Paris salon of Baron d'Holbach. Naigeon quickly adopted the Baron's atheist principles and collaborated with him on his works, overseeing their clandestine printing in Amsterdam and editing d'Holbach's Morale Universelle and his Essai sur les préjugés. Priding himself on a thorough knowledge of the classics, Naigeon would also edit a French translation of the works of Seneca begun by Nicolas La Grange, publishing it along with Diderot's Essai sur les régnes de Claude et de Néron (Paris, 1778). Other editorial work included the Essays of Montaigne and a translation of Toland's philosophical letters.

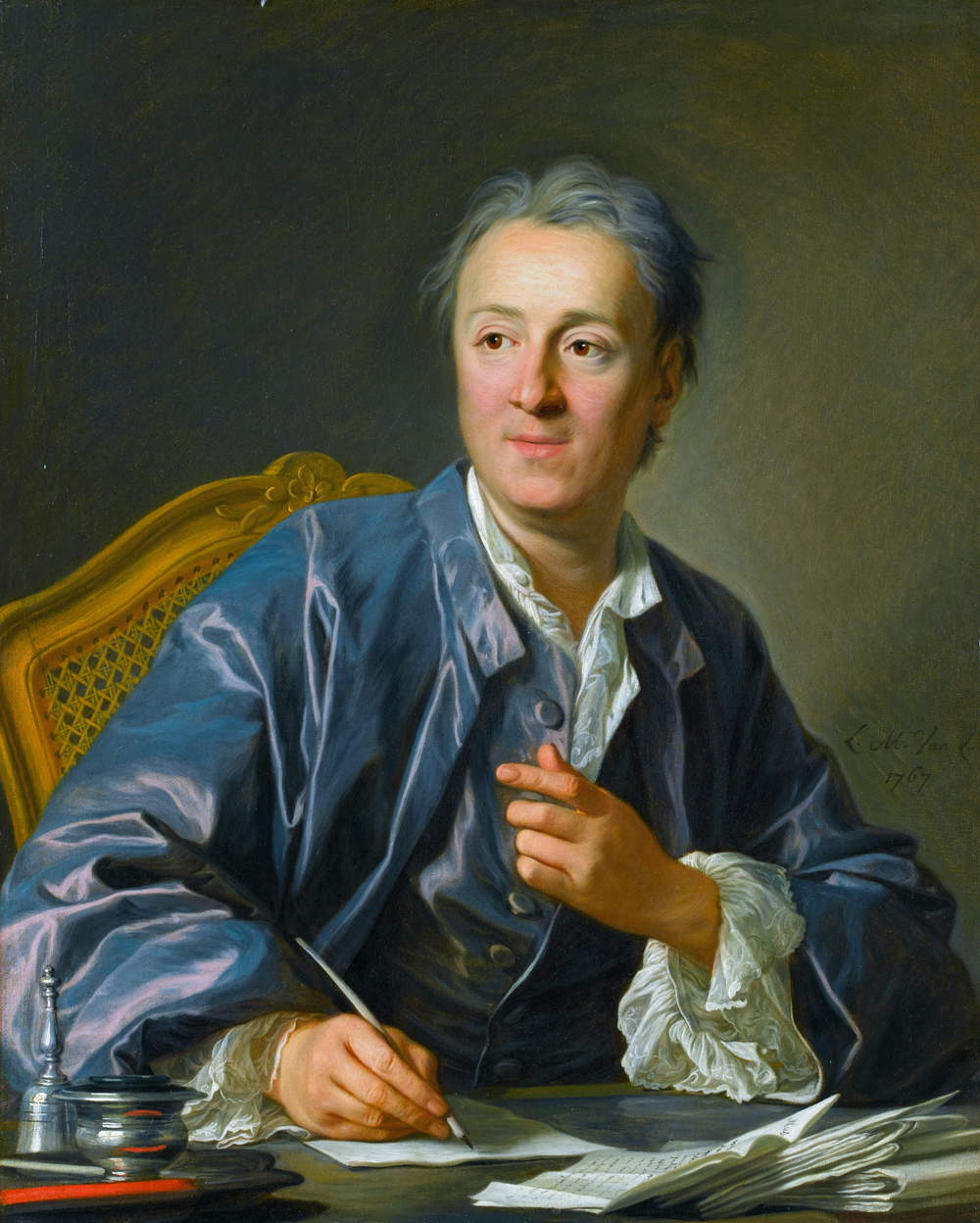
Portrait of Denis Diderot by Louis-Michel van Loo, 1767. Naigeon is best known for editing the works of the famous encyclopédiste Denis Diderot

Naigeon became the editor, compiler and commentator of Diderot's works after the latter made him his literary executor. He published an incomplete edition of Diderot's works in 1798 after writing Mémoires historiques et philosophiques sur la vie et les ouvrages de Diderot, an unfinished commentary on his life and works.

Naigeon's only original stand-alone work was Le militaire philosophe, ou Difficultés sur la religion, proposées au Père Malebranche (London and Amsterdam, 1768), which was based on an earlier anonymous manuscript and whose final chapter was written by d'Holbach. This work mostly repeated the atheist, anti-Christian, determinist materialist arguments found in the radical literature of the second half of the 18th century.

Naigeon continued his attacks on religion in his Dictionary of Ancient and Modern Philosophy in the Encyclopédie méthodique (1791–1794). In his address to the National Assembly in 1790 (Adresse à l'Assemblée nationale sur la liberté des opinions) he called for absolute freedom of the press, asking the Assembly to withhold the name of God and religion from their declaration of the rights of man. He was highly critical of Rousseau believing, in 1792, that, to save the Revolution, Rousseau needed to be defeated and the importance of reason to be upheld

== Bibliography ==
- Les Chinois, a comedy written with Charles Simon Favart (1756)
- Le Militaire philosophe ou, Difficultés sur la religion proposées au R.P. Malebranche (London and Amsterdam, 1768)
- Éloge de La Fontaine (1775)
- Adresse à l'Assemblée nationale sur la liberté des opinions (1790)
- Dictionnaire de philosophie ancienne et moderne 3 vol. (1791-1794)
- Mémoire sur la vie et les œuvres de Diderot (1821)
- "Unitaires" in Encyclopédie ou Dictionnaire raisonné des sciences, des arts et des métiers (17 vols.: Paris, 1751-1765)
