= Guillaume Thomas François Raynal =

French writer (1713–1796)

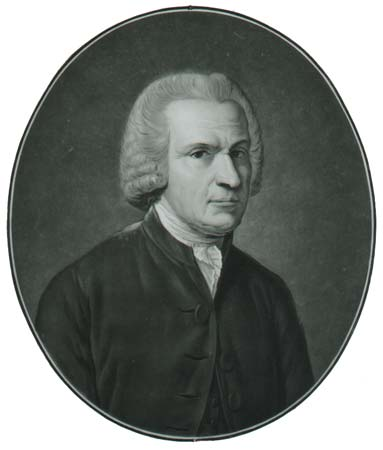
Portrait of Guillaume Raynal. (Musée de la Révolution française).

Guillaume Thomas François Raynal (12 April 1713 – 6 March 1796), also known as Abbé Raynal, was a French writer, former Catholic priest, and man of letters during the Age of Enlightenment.

== Early life ==
He was born at Lapanouse in Rouergue. He was educated at the Jesuit school of Pézenas, and received priest's orders, but he was dismissed for unexplained reasons from the parish of Saint-Sulpice, Paris. He became a writer and journalist, leaving the religious life. The Abbé Raynal wrote for the Mercure de France, and compiled a series of popular but superficial works, which he published and sold himself. These—L'Histoire du stathoudérat (The Hague, 1748), L'Histoire du parlement d'Angleterre (London, 1748), Anecdotes historiques (Amsterdam, 3 vols., 1753)—gained for him access to the salons of Mme. Geoffrin, Helvétius, and the Baron d'Holbach.

In May 1754, he was elected a Fellow of the Royal Society. In 1775, he was elected as a member to the American Philosophical Society.

== The Histoire philosophique des deux Indes ==
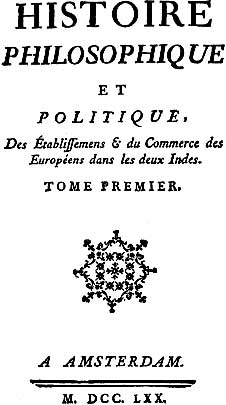
Histoire des deux Indes, 1770

He had the assistance of various members of the coterie philosophique in his most important work, L'Histoire philosophique et politique des établissements et du commerce des Européens dans les deux Indes (Philosophical and Political History of the Two Indies Amsterdam, 4 vols., 1770). Diderot is credited with a third of this work, which was characterized by Voltaire as "du réchauffé avec de la déclamation" ("warmed-up leftovers with some declamation"). The other chief collaborators were Jean Pechméja, Baron d'Holbach, Jacques Paulze, the farmer-general of taxes, the Abbé Martin, and Alexandre Deleyre. To this piecemeal method of composition, in which narrative alternated with tirades on political and social questions, was added the further disadvantage of the lack of exact information, which, owing to the dearth of documents, could only have been gained by personal investigation. He released an expanded edition in 1774 and another in 1780.

The "philosophic" declamations perhaps constituted the work's chief interest for the general public, and its significance as a contribution to democratic propaganda. The Histoire went through many editions, being revised and augmented from time to time by Raynal; it was translated into the principal European languages, and appeared in various abridgments. Its introduction into France was forbidden in 1779; the book was burned by the public executioner, and an order was given for the arrest of the author, whose name had not appeared in the first edition, but was printed on the title page of the Geneva edition of 1780. Seven new maps for the 1798 English edition were engraved by Thomas Kitchin Jr.

The book examines the East Indies, South America, the West Indies, and North America. The final chapter comprises theory around the future of Europe as a whole. Raynal also examines commerce, religion, slavery, and other popular subjects, all from the perspective of the French Enlightenment. Additional versions of the book included maps of the discussed regions.

On the subject of slavery, Raynal was excoriating, writing "I shall...prove that there is no reason of state which can authorize slavery. I shall not be afraid to denounce to the tribunal of reason and justice those governments which tolerate this cruelty. Whoever justifies such an odious system deserves mocking silence from the philosopher…and a stab with a dagger from the back."

== Later life ==
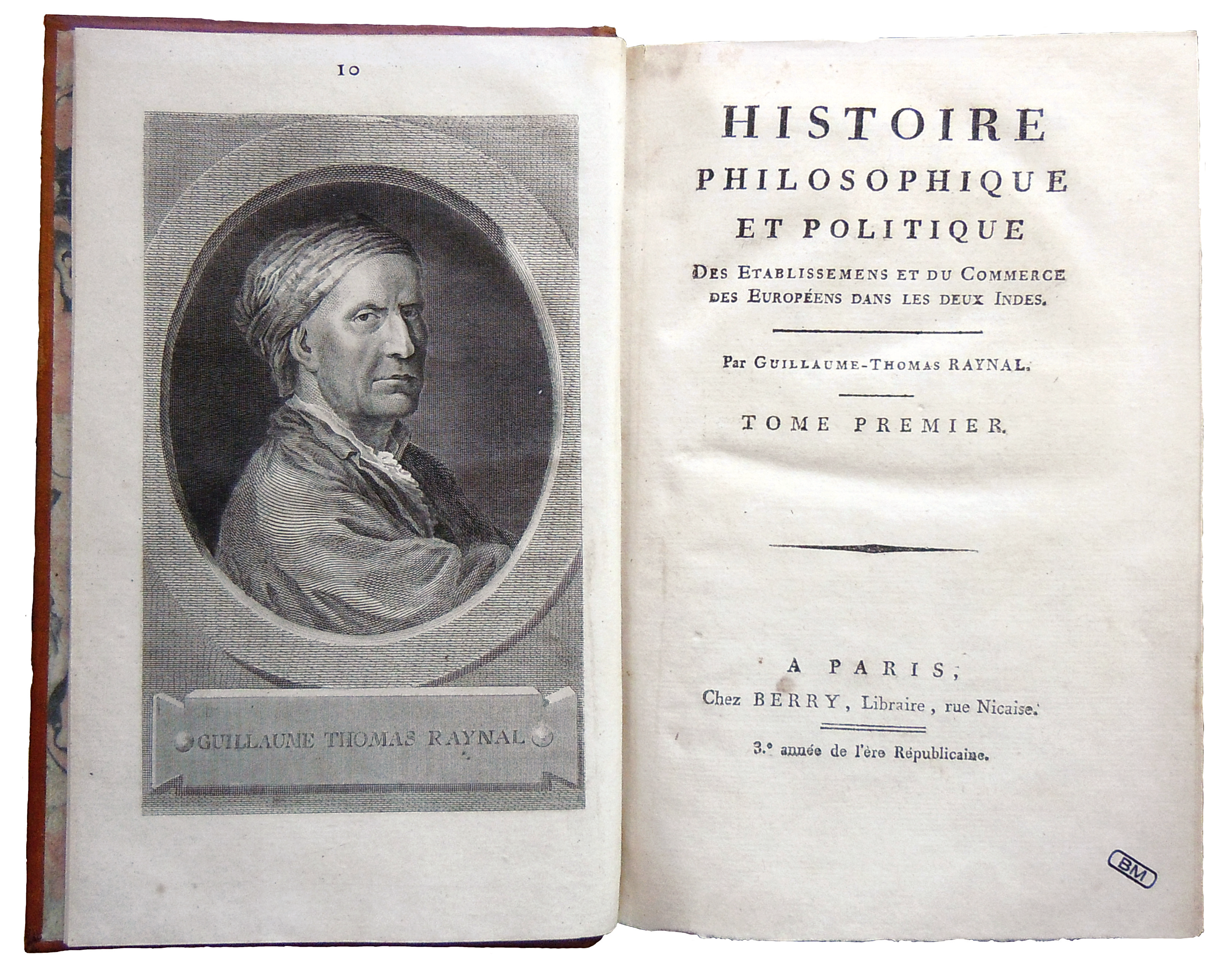
Histoire philosophique, 1794

Raynal went into exile, to Spa, and then to Berlin, where he was coolly received by Frederick the Great, in spite of his connection with the philosophe party.

At Saint Petersburg he met with a more cordial reception from Catherine II, and in 1787 he was permitted to return to France, though not to Paris. He showed generosity in assigning a considerable income to be divided annually among the peasant proprietors of upper Guienne. He was elected by Marseilles to the Estates-General, but refused by reason of his age. Raynal now realized the French Revolution could not be peaceful and, in terror of the proceedings for which his own writings and those of his friends had prepared the way, he sent to the Constituent Assembly an address, which was read on 31 May 1791, deprecating the violence of its reforms.

This address is said by Sainte-Beuve (Nouveaux lundis, xi.) to have been composed chiefly by de Clermont-Tonnerre and Pierre V. Malouet, and it was regarded, even by moderate men, as ill-timed. The published Lettre de l'abbé Raynal a l'Assemblee nationale (10 December 1790) was really the work of the comte de Guibert. During the Terror Raynal lived in retirement at Passy and at Montlhery. On the establishment of the Directory in 1795 he became a member of the newly organized Institut de France.

Raynal died 6 March 1796 at Chaillot.

== Bibliography ==
A detailed bibliography of his works and of those falsely attributed to him will be found in Joseph-Marie Quérard's La France littéraire, and the same author's Supercheries dévoilées. The biography by A Jay, prefixed to Peuchet's edition (Paris, 10 vols, 1820–1821) of the Histoire ... des Indes, is of small value. To this edition Peuchet added two supplementary volumes on colonial development from 1785 to 1824. See also the anonymous Raynal démasqué (1791); Cherhal Montreal, Éloge ... de G. T. Raynal (an. IV.); a notice in the Moniteur (5 vendémiaire, an. V.); B Lunet, Biographie de l'abbé Raynal (Rodez, 1866); and J Morley, Diderot (1891).

- A. Jay, Précis historique sur la vie et les ouvrages de l'abbé Raynal, Paris, 1820;
- A. Feugère, Un Précurseur de la Révolution. L'Abbé Raynal (1713–1796), Angoulême, 1922;
- Raynal, de la polémique à l'histoire, G. Bancarel, G. Goggi ed. Oxford, SVEC, 2000;
- G. Bancarel, Raynal ou le devoir de vérité, Genève Champion, 2004.
- Peter Jimack (ed.), A History of the Two Indies – A Translated Selection of Writings from Raynal's Histoire philosophique et politique des établissements des Européens dans les Deux Indes, Ashgate, 2006. ISBN 978-0-7546-4043-1.

== See also ==
- List of abolitionist forerunners
