= Baron d'Holbach =

German-born French philosopher (1723–1789)

Paul Thiry d'Holbach
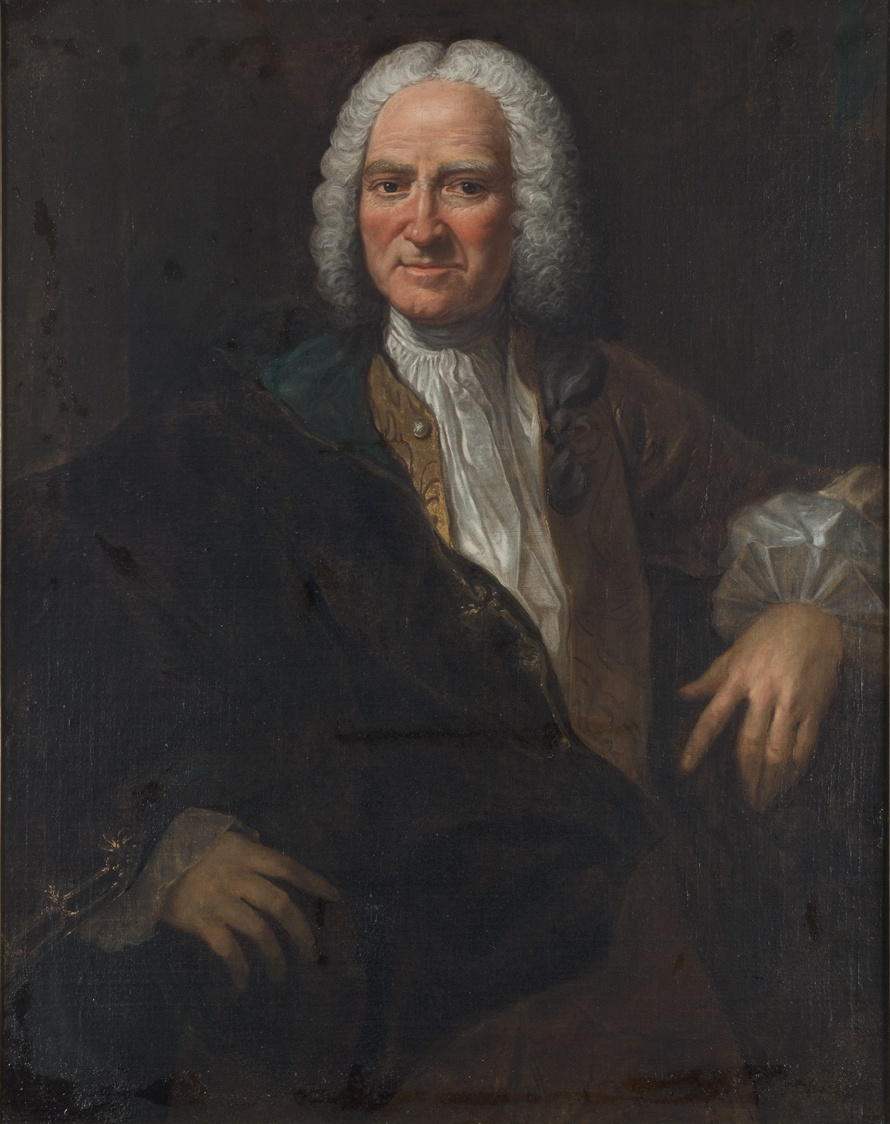
- Portrait by Alexander Roslin
- Born: Paul Thiry; 8 December 1723; Edesheim near Landau, Rhenish Palatinate (present-day Germany)
- Died: 21 January 1789 (aged 65); Paris, Kingdom of France
- Resting place: Saint-Roch, Paris
- Other names: Paul Thiry, Baron d'Holbach d'Holbach

Philosophical work
- Era: 18th-century philosophy
- Region: Western philosophy
- School: French materialism
- Main interests: Atheism, determinism, materialism

Paul Thiry, Baron d'Holbach (/ˈdoʊlbɑːk/; French: [dɔlbak]; 8 December 1723 – 21 January 1789), known as d'Holbach, was a Franco-German philosopher, encyclopedist and writer, who was a prominent figure in the French Enlightenment. He was born in Edesheim, near Landau in the Rhenish Palatinate, but lived and worked mainly in Paris, where he kept a salon. He helped in the dissemination of "Protestant and especially German thought", particularly in the field of the sciences, but was known more for his atheism and voluminous writings against religion, famously including The System of Nature (1770) and The Universal Morality (1776).

== Biography ==
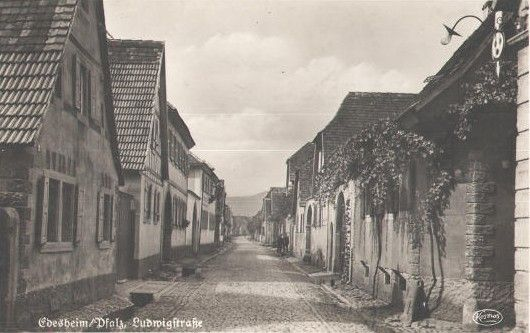
View down the Ludwigstrasse in Edesheim (Rhineland-Palatinate). The birthplace of Paul Henri Thiry d'Holbach was in the house n° 4. Old picture postcard from 1940.

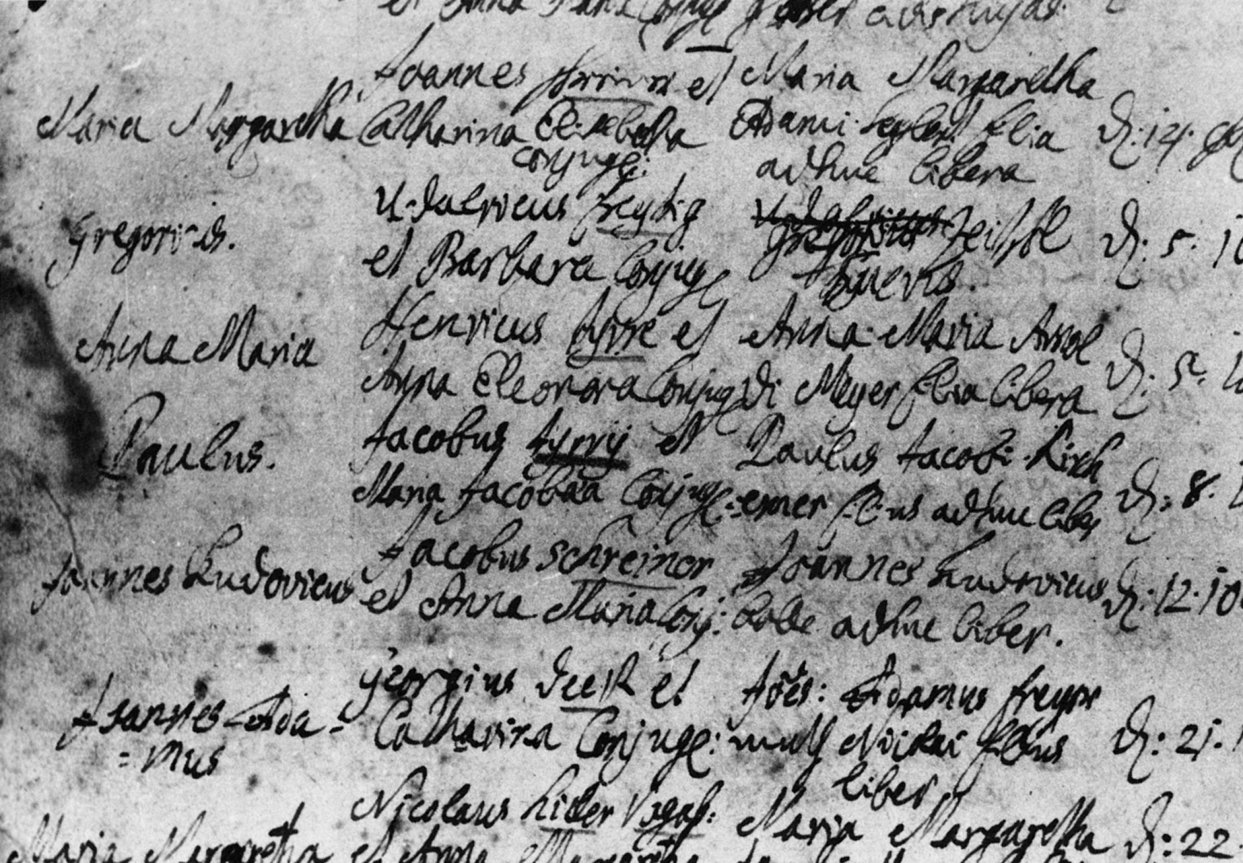
Segment of his baptism certificate

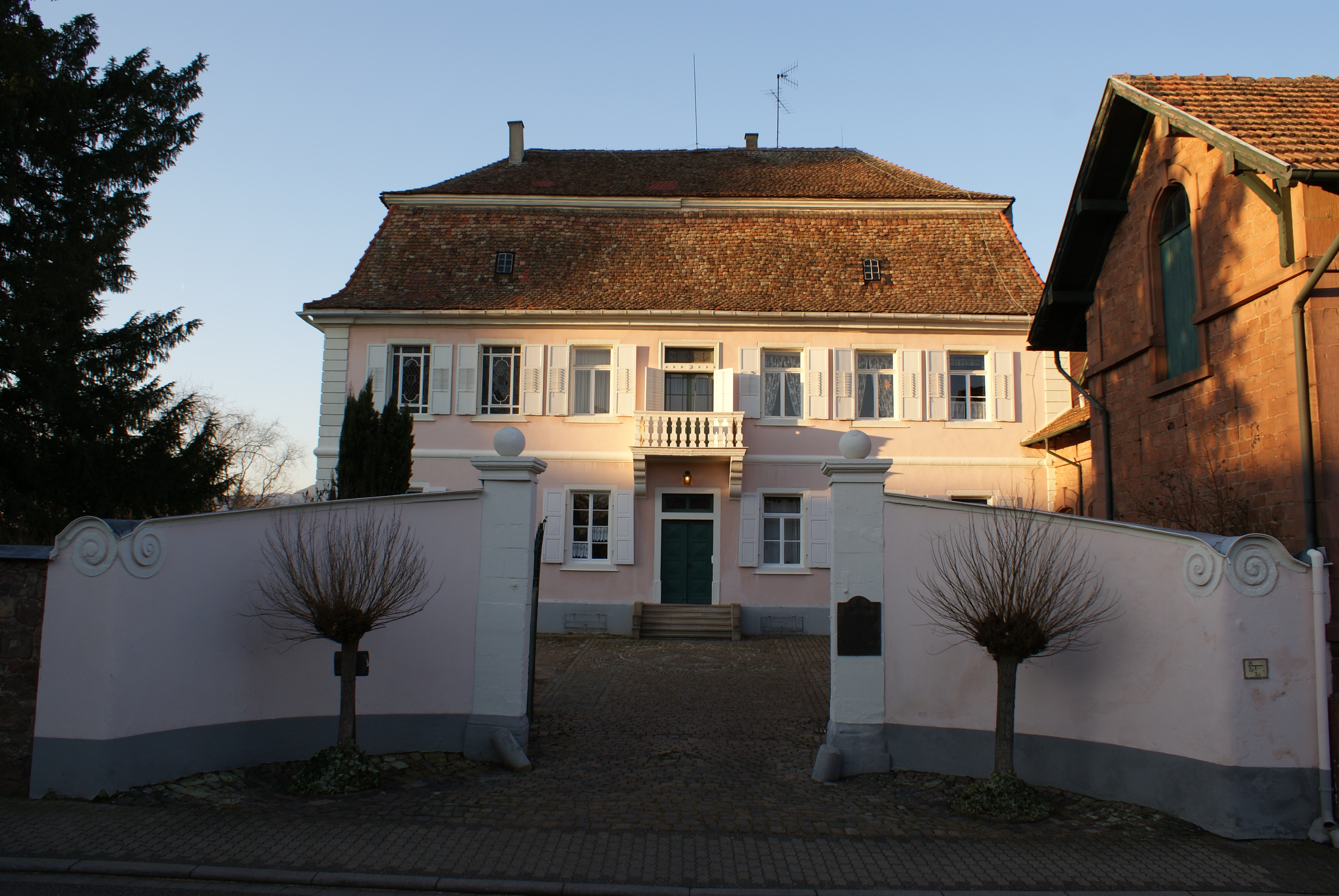
Franz Adam Holbach's, or Adam François d'Holbach's house in Edesheim, Schloss Kupperwolf

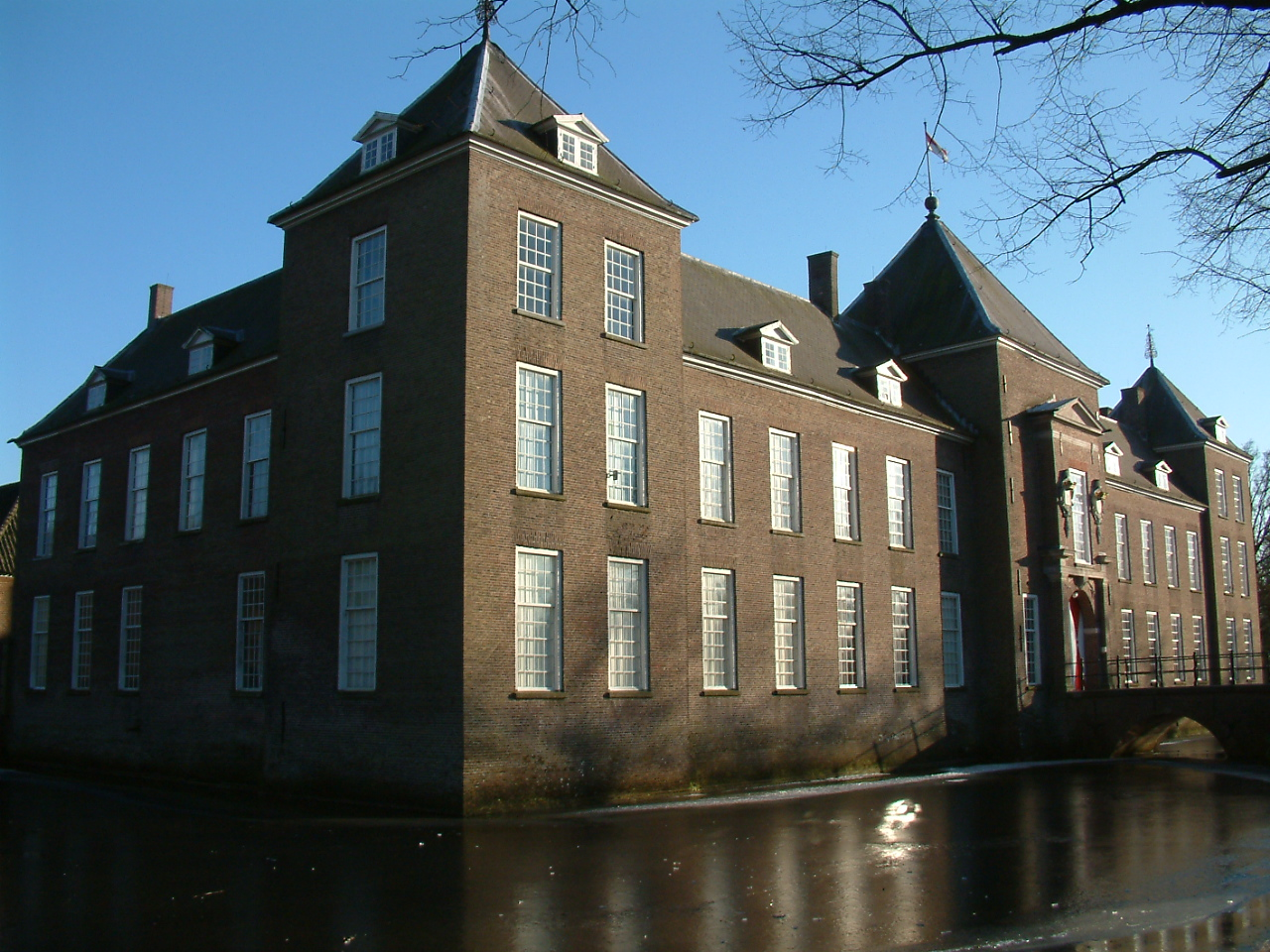
Kasteel Heeze te Heeze, from the year 1733 in possession of François Adam d'Holbach. In 1735 additional buildings were erected. Paul Henri Thiry Holbach inherited this estate in 1750.

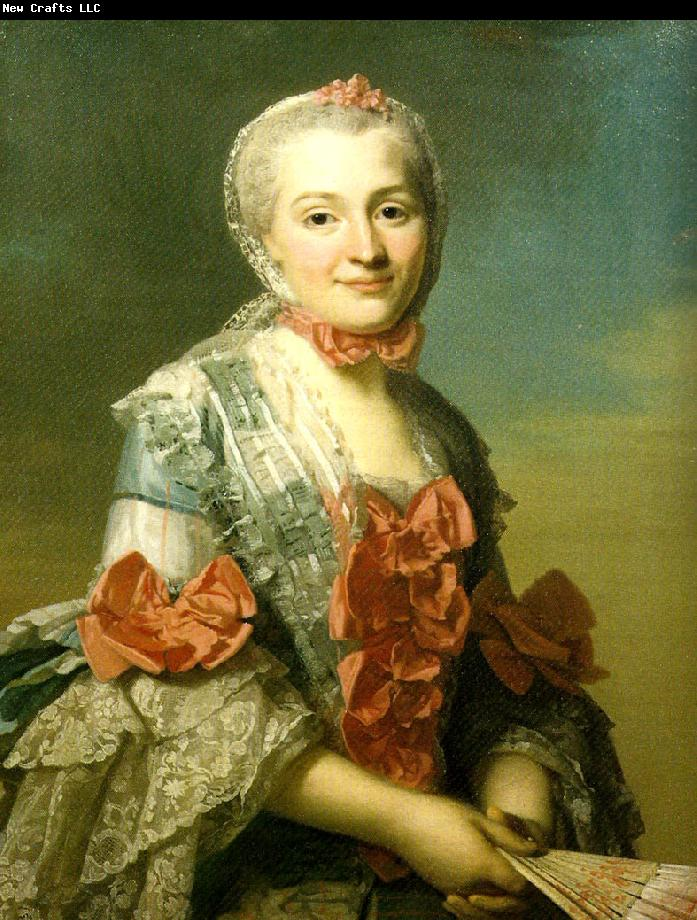
Portrait of M^{me} Charlotte Suzanne d´Holbach, his second wife. Oil painting from Alexander Roslin (1718–1793)

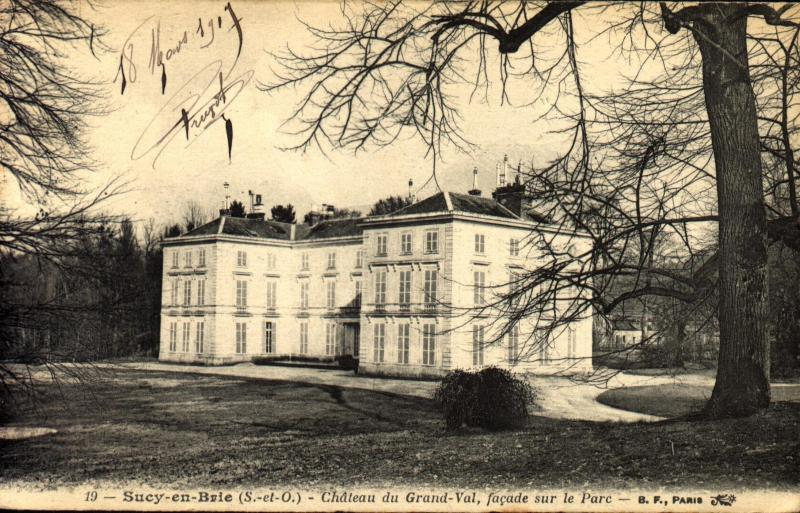
Le Château de Grand-Val; view of the park site

Sources differ regarding d'Holbach's dates of birth and death. His exact birthday is unknown, although records show that he was baptised on 8 December 1723. Some authorities incorrectly give June 1789 as the month of his death. D'Holbach's mother, Catherine Jacobina (née Holbach; 1684–1743), was the daughter of Johannes Jacobus Holbach (died 1723). His father, Johann Jakob Dietrich (with other notations: ger.: Johann Jakob Dirre; fr.: Jean-Jacques Thiry; 1672–1756), was a wine-grower.

D'Holbach wrote nothing of his childhood, although it is known he was raised in Paris as a Catholic by his uncle Franz Adam Holbach (or Adam François d'Holbach or Messire François-Adam, Baron d'Holbach, Seigneur de Heeze, Leende et autres Lieux; approx. 1675–1753), who had become a millionaire by speculating on the Paris stock-exchange. With his financial support, d'Holbach attended Leiden University from 1744 to 1748, where he became a friend of John Wilkes. In 1750, he married his second cousin, Basile-Geneviève d'Aine (1728–1754), and in 1753 a son was born to them, François Nicholas, who left France before his father died. In 1753 both d'Holbach's uncle and father died, leaving him with an enormous inheritance, including Heeze Castle, Kasteel Heeze te Heeze.

D'Holbach remained wealthy throughout his life. In 1754, his wife died from an unknown disease. The distraught d'Holbach moved to the provinces for a brief period with his friend Baron Grimm and in the following year received a special dispensation from the Pope to marry his deceased wife's sister, Charlotte-Suzanne d'Aine (1733–1814). They had a son, Charles-Marius (1757–1832), and two daughters, Amélie-Suzanne (13 January 1759) and Louise-Pauline (19 December 1759 – 1830).

During the summer months, when Paris was hot and humid, Baron d'Holbach retreated to his country estate at Grandval, Le Château de Grand-Val (Sucy-en-Brie today N° 27 rue du Grand-Val on the outskirts of Paris (Département Val-de-Marne). There he would invite friends to stay for a few days or weeks, and every year he invited Denis Diderot whom he joined at an Anglican chapel service at the opening of the English Embassy led by Laurence Sterne.

D'Holbach was known for his generosity, often providing financial support discreetly or anonymously to his friends, amongst them Diderot. It is thought that the virtuous atheist Wolmar in Jean-Jacques Rousseau's Julie, ou la nouvelle Héloïse is based on d'Holbach. Holbach died in Paris on 21 January 1789, a few months before the French Revolution. The authorship of his various anti-religious works did not become widely known until the early 19th century. Ironically, he was buried in the Church of Saint-Roch, Paris. The exact location of the grave is unknown.

== D'Holbach's salon ==
From c. 1750 to c. 1790, Baron d'Holbach used his wealth to maintain one of the more notable and lavish Parisian salons, which soon became an important meeting place for the contributors to the Encyclopédie.

Meetings were held regularly twice a week, on Sundays and Thursdays, in d'Holbach's home in rue Royale. Visitors to the salon were exclusively males, and the tone of discussion highbrow, often extending to topics more extensive than those of other salons. This, along with the excellent food, expensive wine, and a library of over 3000 volumes, attracted many notable visitors. Among the regulars in attendance at the salon—the coterie holbachique—were the following: Diderot, Grimm, Condillac, Condorcet, D'Alembert, Marmontel, Turgot, La Condamine, Raynal, Helvétius, Galiani, Morellet, Naigeon and, for a time, Jean-Jacques Rousseau. The salon was also visited by prominent British intellectuals, amongst them Adam Smith, David Hume, John Wilkes, Horace Walpole, Edward Gibbon, David Garrick, Laurence Sterne; the Italian Cesare Beccaria; and the American Benjamin Franklin.

Morellet, a regular attendee at D'Holbach's salon, described it as:

the place to hear the freest, most animated, and most instructive conversation that ever was...in regard to philosophy, religion, and government; light pleasantries had no place there.

In a frequently narrated story about a discussion that had taken place in D'Holbach's salon, David Hume had questioned whether atheists actually existed whereupon D'Holbach had clarified that Hume was sitting at a table with seventeen atheists.

== Writings ==
=== Contributions to the Encyclopédie ===
For the Encyclopédie d'Holbach authored and translated a large number of articles on topics ranging from politics and religion to chemistry and mineralogy. As a German who had become a naturalised Frenchman, he undertook the translation of many contemporary German works of natural philosophy into French. Between 1751 and 1765, D'Holbach contributed some four hundred articles to the project, mostly on scientific subjects, in addition to serving as the editor of several volumes on natural philosophy. D'Holbach might also have written several disparaging entries on non-Christian religions, intended as veiled criticisms of Christianity itself.

=== Anti-religious works ===
Despite his extensive contributions to the Encyclopédie, d'Holbach is better known today for his philosophical writings, all of which were published anonymously or under pseudonyms and printed outside France, usually in Amsterdam by Marc-Michel Rey. His philosophy was expressly materialistic and atheistic and is today categorised into the philosophical movement called French materialism. In 1761 Christianisme dévoilé (Christianity Unveiled) appeared, in which he attacked Christianity and religion in general as an impediment to the moral advancement of humanity. The deistic Voltaire, denying authorship of the work, made known his aversion to d'Holbach's philosophy, writing that "[the work] is entirely opposed to my principles. This book leads to an atheistic philosophy that I detest." Christianity Unveiled was followed by others, notably La Contagion sacrée, (Note: 1768 – "The Sacred Contagion") Théologie portative, (Note: 1768 – "Portable Theology") and Essai sur les préjugés. (Note: 1770 – "Essay on prejudice") D'Holbach was helped in these endeavours by Jacques-André Naigeon, who would later become his literary executor.

=== The System of Nature ===
In 1770, d'Holbach published his most famous book, The System of Nature (Le Système de la nature), under the name of Jean-Baptiste de Mirabaud, the secretary of the Académie who had died ten years previously. Denying the existence of a deity, and refusing to admit as evidence all a priori arguments, d'Holbach saw the universe as nothing more than matter in motion, bound by inexorable natural laws of cause and effect. "There is", he wrote, "no necessity to have recourse to supernatural powers to account for the formation of things."

The System of Nature is a long and extensive work presenting a thoroughly naturalistic view of the world. Some d'Holbach scholars have pointed out that Denis Diderot was a close friend of d'Holbach's, and that it is unclear to what extent d'Holbach was influenced by him. Indeed, Diderot may have been the author of parts of the System of Nature. Regardless, however, of the extent of Diderot's contribution to the System of Nature, it is on the basis of this work that d'Holbach's philosophy has been called "the culmination of French materialism and atheism".

D'Holbach's objectives in challenging religion were primarily moral: he saw the institutions of Christianity as a major obstacle to the improvement of society. For him, the foundation of morality was to be sought not in Scripture or the moral teachings of the Catholic Church, but in happiness: "It would be useless and almost unjust to insist upon a man's being virtuous if he cannot be so without being unhappy. So long as vice renders him happy, he should love vice." D'Holbach's radicalism posited that humans were fundamentally motivated by the pursuit of enlightened self-interest, which is what he meant by "society", rather than by empty and selfish gratification of purely individual needs. Chapter 15 of Part I of System of Nature is titled "Of Man's true Interest, or of the Ideas he forms to himself of Happiness. – Man cannot be happy without Virtue."

It is quite natural in man, it is extremely reasonable, it is absolutely necessary, to desire those things which can contribute to augment the sum of his felicity. Pleasure, riches, power, are objects worthy his ambition, deserving his most strenuous efforts, when he has learned how to employ them; when he has acquired the faculty of making them render his existence really more agreeable. It is impossible to censure him who desires them, to despise him who commands them, but when to obtain them he employs odious means; or when after he has obtained them he makes a pernicious use of them, injurious to himself, prejudicial to others; let him wish for power, let him seek after grandeur, let him be ambitious of reputation, when he can show just pretensions to them; when he can obtain them, without making the purchase at the expense of his own repose, or that of the beings with whom he lives: let him desire riches, when he knows how to make a use of them that is truly advantageous for himself, really beneficial for others; but never let him employ those means to procure them of which he may be ashamed; with which he may be obliged to reproach himself; which may draw upon him the hatred of his associates; or which may render him obnoxious to the castigation of society: let him always recollect, that his solid happiness should rest its foundations upon its own esteem – upon the advantages he procures for others; above all, never let him for a moment forget, that of all the objects to which his ambition may point, the most impracticable for a being who lives in society, is that of attempting to render himself exclusively happy.

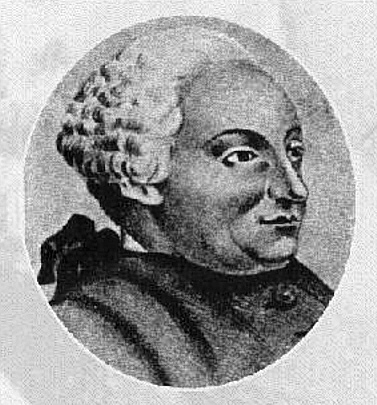
Baron d'Holbach

The explicitly atheistic and materialistic The System of Nature presented a core of radical ideas which many contemporaries, both churchmen and philosophes found disturbing, and thus prompted a strong reaction.

The Catholic Church in France threatened the crown with withdrawal of financial support unless it effectively suppressed the circulation of the book. The list of people writing refutations of the work was long. The prominent Catholic theologian Nicolas-Sylvestre Bergier wrote a refutation titled Examen du matérialisme ("Materialism examined"). Voltaire hastily seized his pen to refute the philosophy of the Système in the article "Dieu" in his Dictionnaire philosophique, while Frederick the Great also drew up an answer to it. Its principles are summed up in a more popular form in d'Holbach's Good Sense, or Natural Ideas Opposed to Supernatural. (Note: Bon Sens, ou idées naturelles opposées aux idées surnaturelles. Amsterdam, 1772)

=== Politics and morals ===
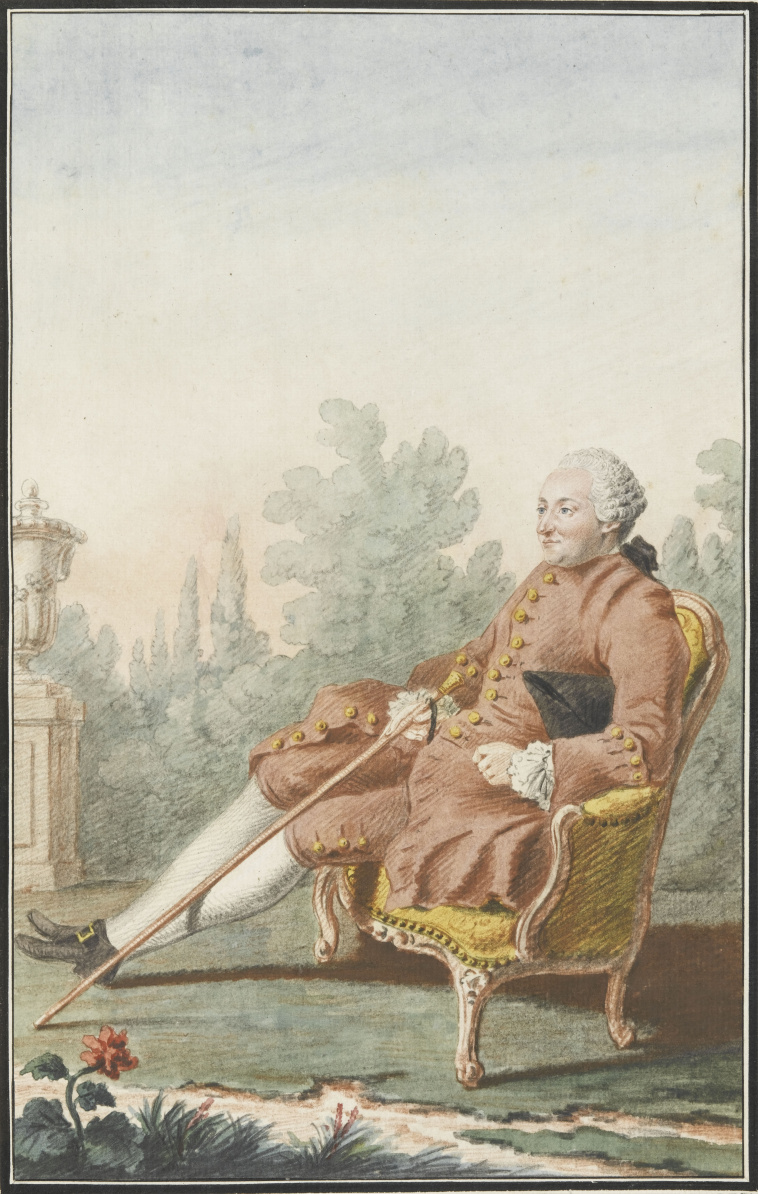
D'Holbach by Louis Carmontelle

In his last works, D'Holbach's attention largely shifted away from religious metaphysics towards moral and political questions. In the Système social (1773), the Politique naturelle (1773–1774) and the Morale universelle (1776) he attempted to describe a system of morality in place of the Christian one he had so fiercely attacked, but these later writings were not as popular or influential as his earlier work. D'Holbach was critical towards abuses of power in France and abroad. Contrary to the revolutionary spirit of the time however, he called for the educated classes to reform the corrupt system of government and warned against revolution, democracy, and mob rule. His political and ethical views were influenced by British materialist Thomas Hobbes. D'Holbach personally translated Hobbes' work De Homine ("Of Man") into French.

=== Economic views ===
In his Système de la nature, the three-volume Système social (1772), two-volume Politique naturelle (1772), and Ethocratie (1776), d'Holbach gave his economic views. Following Locke, d'Holbach defended private property, and stated that wealth is generated from labor and all should have the right to the product of their labor. He endorsed the theory of laissez-faire, arguing:

The government should do nothing for the merchant except to leave him alone. No regulations can guide him in his enterprise so well as his own interest. ... The state owes commerce nothing but protection. Among commercial nations those that allow their subjects the most unlimited liberty may be sure of soon excelling all others.

D'Holbach believed that the state should prevent a dangerous concentration of wealth amongst a few individuals from taking place. According to him, hereditary aristocracy should be abolished on the ground that it breeds indolence and incompetence. He criticized the then prevailing policy of the French government to let private individuals collect tax on the ground that the tax collectors often extort double the money they are supposed to collect from the citizens. He also believed that religious groups should be voluntary organizations without any government support. In addition, D'Holbach is counted among the fiercest critics of luxury in the 18th-century debate.

== Death ==
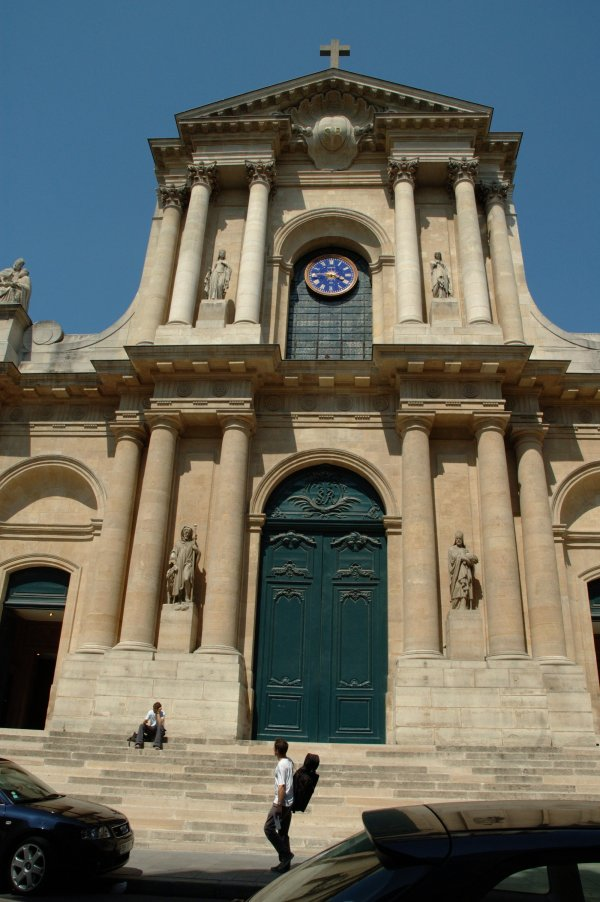
Church of Saint-Roch, front view of the church in which he and his friend Denis Diderot were buried.

D'Holbach is believed to have died shortly before the French Revolution. He was buried on 21 January 1789, in the ossuarium beneath the altar in the parish church of Saint-Roch, Paris. This ossuarium has been ransacked twice, once during the French Revolution, and again during the 1871 Paris Commune.

== D'Holbach and his contemporaries ==
=== D'Holbach and Diderot ===
It is not clear when d'Holbach and Diderot first met, but by 1752 they definitely knew each other. This was the year when Volume II of the Encyclopédie, containing contributions by d'Holbach, appeared. The two were in substantial agreement on questions related to religion and philosophy. They also shared similar interests like gourmandizing, taking country walks and collecting fine prints, and beautiful paintings.

When d'Holbach's radically atheistic and materialistic The System of Nature was first published, many believed Diderot to be the actual author of the book. Based on the writing style, the Durants opine that the book was not written by Diderot although he may have composed the flowery address to Nature towards the end of the book.

=== D'Holbach and Rousseau ===
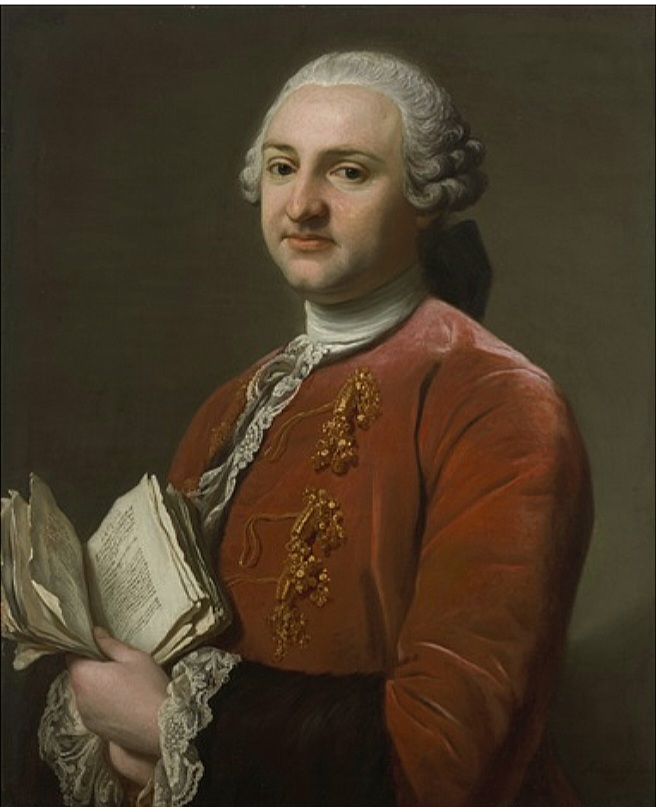
Baron d'Holbach painted by Roslin, 1757

The attendees at d'Holbach's dinners included Jean-Jacques Rousseau. Rousseau stopped attending the salon for some time after an incident in February 1754. Diderot had arranged for an acquaintance of his, the Abbé Petit, to read a tragedy composed by the Abbé at d'Holbach's. When the Abbé presented his work, he preceded it by reading his treatise on theatrical composition which the attendees at d'Holbach's found so absurd that they could not help being amused. The attendees —Diderot, Marmontel, Grimm, Saint-Lambert, and others— then proceeded to direct lavish praise at the Abbé which made him happy. D'Holbach later narrated what happened:

I will confess that, half-laughingly, half-soberly, I myself strung the poor curé along. Jean-Jacques hadn't said a word, hadn't smiled an instant, hadn't moved from his armchair. Suddenly he rose up like a madman and, springing towards the curé, took his manuscript, threw it on the floor, and cried to the appalled author, "Your play is worthless, your dissertation an absurdity, all these gentlemen are making fun of you. Leave here, and go back to do curate's duty in your village." Then the curé got up, no less furious, spewed forth all imaginable insults against his too sincere advisor, and from insults would have passed to blows and to tragic murder if we had not separated them. Rousseau left in a rage, which I believed to be temporary, but which has never ceased and which has done nothing but increase since that time.

Later in 1754, when he learnt that Mme d'Holbach had died, (Note: This was d'Holbach's first wife. Two years later he would marry her sister.) Rousseau wrote a tender condolence letter to d'Holbach, and the friendship between the two men was rekindled. For three more years, Rousseau would frequent the salon of d'Holbach. D'Holbach later arranged, along with Grimm and Diderot, for an annuity of 400 livres for Rousseau's common-law wife Thérèse Levasseur and her mother, pledging them not to reveal this to Rousseau for fear of wounding Rousseau's pride. When Rousseau eventually found out about this, he was furious with his friends for humiliating him. (Note: According to Rousseau, most of this money was pocketed by Thérèse's mother for herself, and for her other daughters.)

== Appreciation and influence ==
According to Marmontel, d'Holbach "had read everything and never forgotten anything of interest". Jean-Jacques Rousseau commented that d'Holbach could hold his own among scholars since he was learned and knowledgeable. Diderot enthusiastically endorsed d'Holbach's book System of Nature. D'Holbach's philosophy influenced Marat, Danton, and Camille Desmoulins. According to Faguet, "d'Holbach, more than Voltaire, more than Diderot, is the father of all the philosophy and all the anti-religious polemics at the end of the eighteenth and the first half of the nineteenth century."

During the French Directory, a book of d'Holbach was circulated to all departmental heads in a bid to rein in religious revivalism. In England, d'Holbach's views influenced Priestley, Godwin, and Shelley. In Germany, d'Holbach's views influenced Immanuel Kant. (Note: It was the combination of d'Holbach's materialism and Hume's skepticism that awoke Kant from his "dogmatic slumber".) It is speculated that d'Holbach's views influenced the historical materialism of Karl Marx.

Asteroid (6956) Holbach is named in honour of d'Holbach.

== See also ==
- Ibn al-Rawandi
- Lists of atheists

== Bibliography ==
=== Works ===
- Le Christianisme dévoilé, ou Examen des principes et des effets de la religion chrétienne (Christianity unveiled: being an examination of the principles and effects of the Christian religion) published in Nancy, 1761
- La Contagion sacrée, ou Histoire naturelle de la superstition, 1768
- Lettres à Eugénie, ou Préservatif contre les préjugés, 1768
- Théologie Portative, ou Dictionnaire abrégé de la religion chrétienne, 1768
- Essai sur les préjugés, ou De l'influence des opinions sur les mœurs & le bonheur des hommes, 1770
- Système de la nature ou des loix du monde physique & du monde moral (The System of Nature, or Laws of the Moral and Physical World), published 1770 in 2 volumes in French under the pseudonym of Mirabaud. vol.1 text, vol.2 text at Project Gutenberg, en français.
- Histoire critique de Jésus-Christ, ou Analyse raisonnée des évangiles, 1770 (Ecce Homo! Or, A Critical Inquiry into the History of Jesus Christ; Being a Rational Analysis of the Gospels)
- Tableau des Saints, ou Examen de l'esprit, de la conduite, des maximes & du mérite des personages que le christiannisme révère & propose pour modèles, 1770
- Le Bon Sens, published 1772 (Good Sense: or, Natural Ideas Opposed to Supernatural). This was an abridged version of The System of Nature. It was published anonymously in Amsterdam.
- Politique Naturelle, ou Discours sur les vrais principes du Gouvernement, 1773
- Système Social, ou Principes naturels de la morale et de la Politique, avec un examen de l'influence du gouvernement sur les mœurs 1773
- Ethocratie, ou Le gouvernement fondé sur la morale (Ethocracy or Government Founded on Ethics) (Amsterdam, 1776)
- La Morale Universelle, ou Les devoirs de l'homme fondés sur la Nature, 1776 en français, PDF file.
- Eléments de morale universelle, ou Catéchisme de la Nature, 1790
- Lettre à une dame d'un certain âge
- Essai sur l'art de ramper, à l'usage des courtisans

=== Secondary literature ===
==== English ====
- Mark Curran, Atheism, Religion and Enlightenment in pre-Revolutionary Europe (Royal Historical Society, 2012).
- Jonathan Israel, A Revolution of the Mind: Radical Enlightenment and the Intellectual Origins of Modern Democracy (Princeton University Press 2010).
- Alan Charles Kors, D'Holbach's Coterie: An Enlightenment in Paris (Princeton University Press, 1976).
- Alan Charles Kors, "The Atheism of D'Holbach and Naigeon", Atheism from the Reformation to the Enlightenment (Oxford: Clarendon Press, 1992).
- Everett C. Ladd Jr., "Helvétius and d'Holbach", Journal of the History of Ideas (1962) 23(2): 221–238.
- John Lough, "Helvétius and d'Holbach", Modern Language Review, Vol. 33, No. 3. (Jul. 1938).
- John Lough, Essays on the Encyclopédie of Diderot and D'Alembert (London: Oxford University Press, 1968).
- T. C. Newland, "D'Holbach, Religion, and the 'Encyclopédie'", Modern Language Review, Vol. 69, No. 3, (Jul. 1974), pp. 523–533
- Max Pearson Cushing, Baron d'Holbach: A Study of Eighteenth-Century Radicalism in France (New York, 1914).
- G. V. Plekhanov, Essays in the History of Materialism (trans. 1934).
- Ruggero Sciuto, Determinism and Enlightenment: The Collaboration of Diderot and d'Holbach (Liverpool: Liverpool University Press, 2023—Oxford University Studies in the Enlightenment).
- S. G. Tallentyre (pseud. for Evelyn Beatrice Hall), The Friends of Voltaire (1907).
- Virgil W. Topazio, D'Holbach's Moral Philosophy: Its Background and Development (Geneva: Institut et Musée Voltaire, 1956).
- Virgil V. Topazio, "Diderot's Supposed Contribution to D'Holbach's Works", in Publications of the Modern Language Association of America, LXIX, 1, 1954, pp. 173–188.
- W. H. Wickwar, Baron d'Holbach: A Prelude to the French Revolution (1935).

==== German ====
- Blom, Philipp (2011). Böse Philosophen: Ein Salon in Paris und das vergessene Erbe der Aufklärung (in German). Hanser, München. ISBN 978-3-446-23648-6.
- Werner Raupp: „Holbach, Paul-Henri Thiry Baron d’“, in Biographisch-Bibliographisches Kirchenlexikon (BBKL), vol. 15 Herzberg: Bautz 1999 (ISBN 3-88309-077-8), col. 716–726 (with detailed bibliography).

==== French ====
- René Hubert, D'Holbach et ses amis (Paris: André Delpeuch, 1928).
- Paul Naville, D'Holbach et la philosophie scientifique au XVIIIe siècle. Rev. ed. Paris, 1967
- J. Vercruysse, Bibliographie descriptive des écrits du baron d'Holbach (Paris, 1971).
- A. Sandrier, Le style philosophique du baron d'Holbach, Honoré Champion (Paris, 2004).
