= List of things named after Jean d'Alembert =

This article is a list of things named after Jean d'Alembert:

== Mathematics and natural sciences ==
- d'Alembert criterion
- d'Alembert force
- d'Alembert operator
  - d'Alembertian
- d’Alembert reduction
- d'Alembert system
- d'Alembert's equation
- d'Alembert's form of the principle of virtual work
- d'Alembert's functional equation
- d'Alembert's formula
- d'Alembert's paradox
- d'Alembert's principle
- d'Alembert's theorem
- d'Alembert–Euler condition

== Fiction and literature ==
- "Le rêve de D'Alembert" ("D'Alembert's Dream"), by Denis Diderot.
- D'Alembert's Principle, a novel by Andrew Crumey (1996).

== Others ==
- Tree of Diderot and d'Alembert
- Ile d'Alembert, island better known by the English name of Lipson Island.
- d'Alembert, crater
