= Alembert =

Alembert and its variants may refer to:

People:

- Jean le Rond d'Alembert (1717–1783), French mathematician, mechanician, physicist, philosopher, and music theorist
- Sandy D'Alemberte (1933–2019), American lawyer and politician

Places:

- D'Alembert (crater), a lunar impact crater

Mathematics and Physics:

- d'Alembert's formula, a mathematical formula
- d'Alembert's paradox, a statement concerning inviscid flow
- d'Alembert's principle, a statement of the fundamental classical laws of motion
- d'Alembert–Euler condition, a mathematical and physical condition
- D'Alembert operator, an operator of the Einstein equation
- Ratio test, also known as d'Alembert's test, a test for the convergence of a series
