= Louis Destouches =

Louis Destouches may refer to:

- Louis-Camus Destouches
- Louis-Ferdinand Destouches
