= The Advancement of Learning =

1605 Book by Francis Bacon

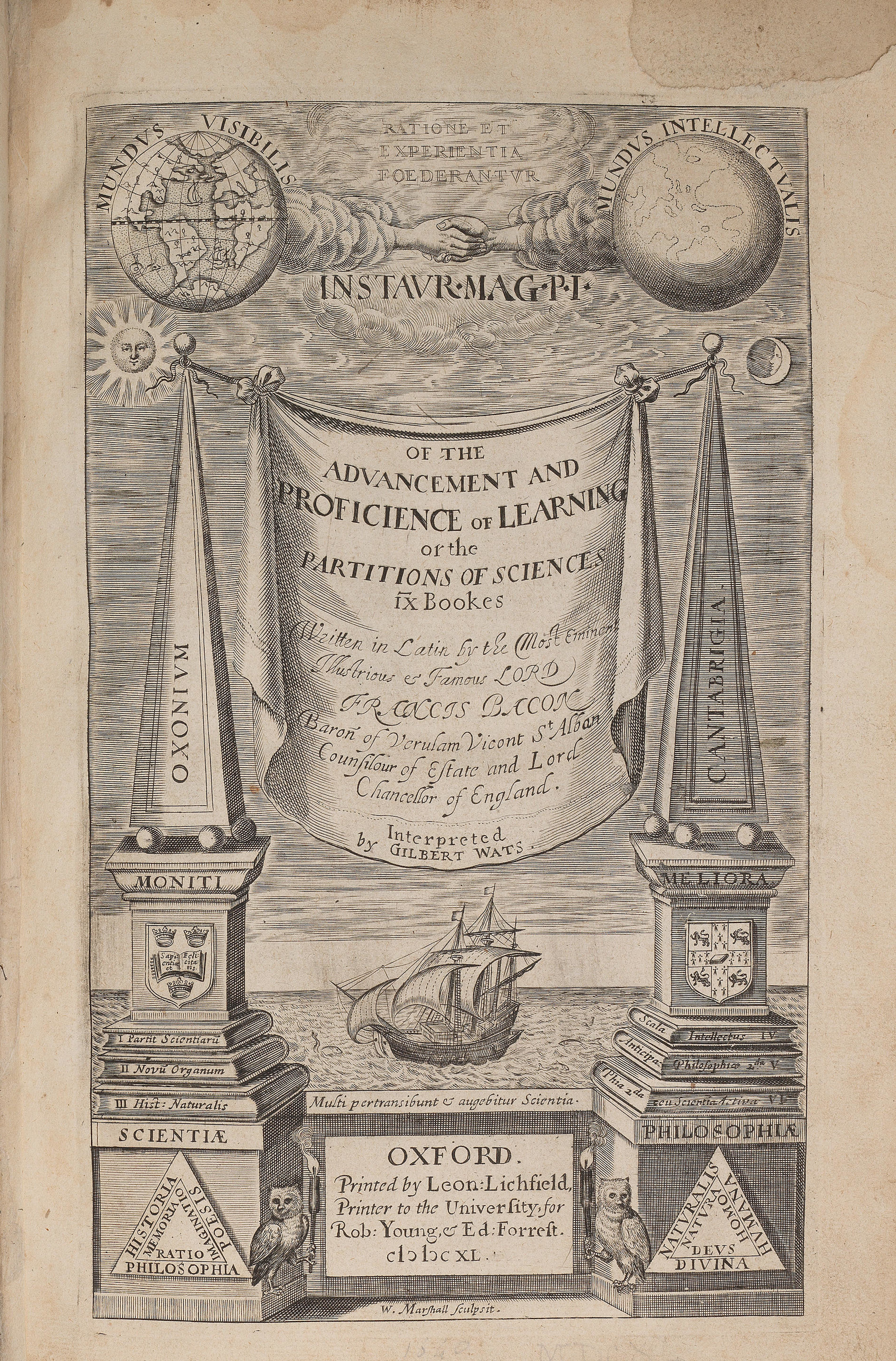
Title page of 1640 edition

The Advancement of Learning (full title: Of the Proficience and Advancement of Learning, Divine and Human) is a 1605 book by Francis Bacon which introduces and popularizes the scientific method of observation, skepticism and testability. (Note: The word order is "Proficience and Advancement" in the Everyman Library edition of 1915, see pages 1 and 61. The order of these words is reversed on the title page of the 1640 edition shown on the right.)

== Origin ==
Bacon, a Protestant, lived during a period of great social turmoil as well as the expansion of scientific and social knowledge. In 1605, he sent a draft to his friend Tobie Matthew who was in Florence where he was baptized as a Roman Catholic. Two years later, in 1607, Matthew returned to England, where he was imprisoned for his alleged "Papist views".

The book is addressed as a plea to King James I and is in two parts or books, each with separate chapters:

- Part I praises the king for his appreciation of knowledge and outlines Bacon's ideas as how strict bondage to the past (notably study of Greek and Roman language and form) was a hindrance to optimizing Christian values, which required not academic excellence but excellent practical education via the contemplation of nature conjoined with action for the benefit of society.
- Part II Bacon outlines Novum Organum which avers the benefit to scholars as less important than the benefit of their scholarship to society. He advocated a new discipline studying the effect of climate, geography and natural resources on the various human races, and suggested handbooks should be prepared for diplomacy, business and the new scientific disciplines. In theology he suggested exploring the limits of human reason in matters divine and setting limits thereto. He recommended improving medicine via vivisection of animals and the prior preparation of medicine.

=== Pure knowledge versus proud knowledge ===
Bacon refutes the claim of King Solomon that knowledge causes anxiety, discontent and rebellion by distinguishing

- pure knowledge arising from the study of nature that leads to growth and grace
- proud knowledge is that of worldly values that lead to atheism

== Consequences ==
This work inspired the taxonomic structure of the highly influential Encyclopédie by Jean le Rond d'Alembert and Denis Diderot, and is credited by Bacon's biographer-essayist Catherine Drinker Bowen with being a pioneering essay in support of empirical philosophy.

The following passage from The Advancement of Learning was used as the foreword to a popular Cambridge textbook:

So that as Tennis is a game of no use in itself, but of great use in respect it maketh a quick eye, and a body ready to put itself in all positions, so, in the Mathematics the use which is collateral, an intervenient, is no less worthy, than that which is principle and intended.
