= Preliminary discourse =

A Preliminary discourse may be prefixed to any publication and may refer to:

- Preliminary Discourse to the Encyclopedia of Diderot
- Preliminary Discourse to AlKoran
