= Classification chart =

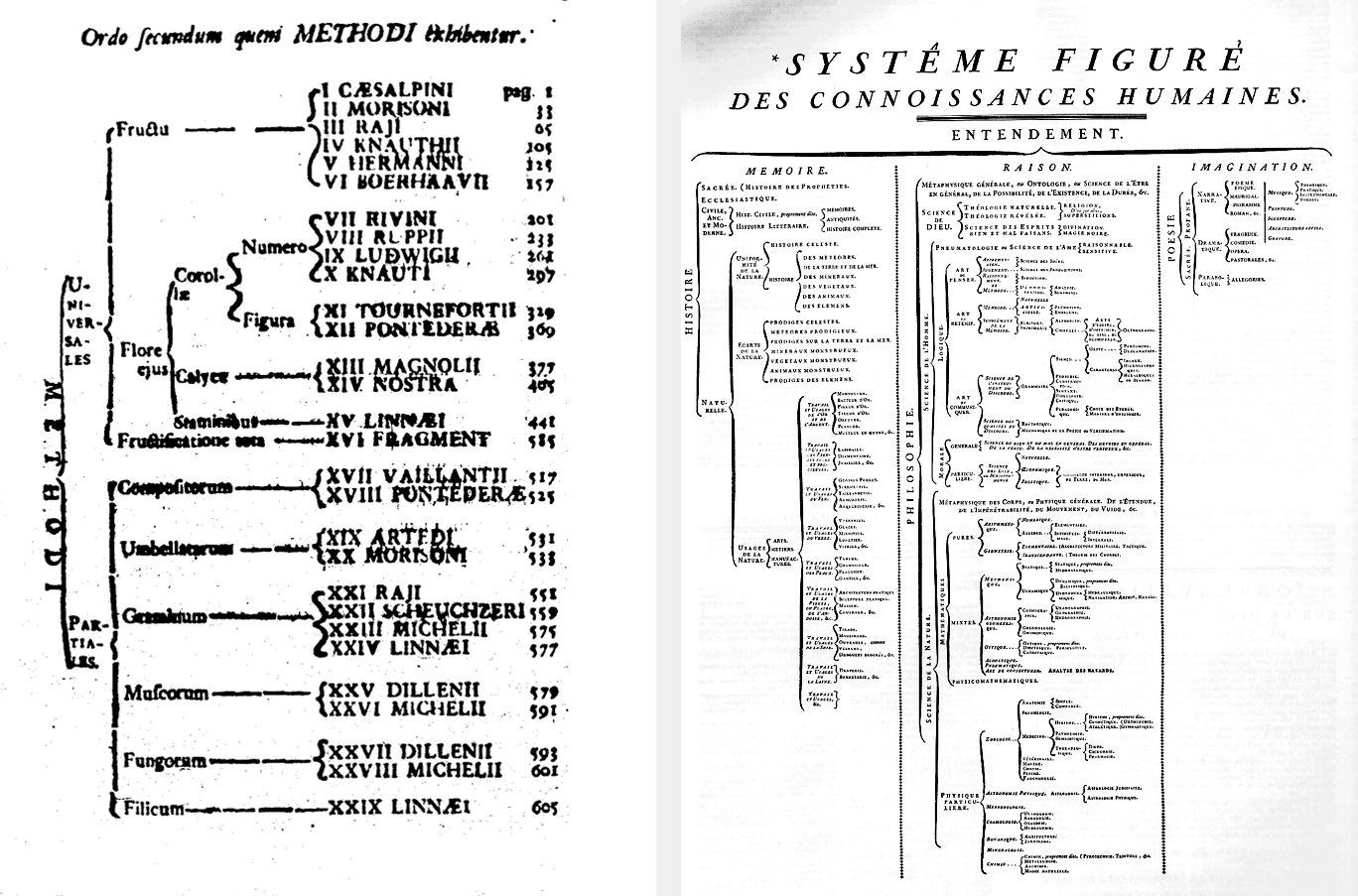
Linné's method for classification of plants in Classes Plantarum 1738, and the Figurative system of human knowledge from Diderot's Encyclopédie, 1752.

Classification chart or classification tree is a synopsis of the classification scheme, designed to illustrate the structure of any particular field.

Classification tree.webm

== Overview ==
Classification is the process in which ideas and objects are recognized, differentiated, and understood, and classification charts are intended to help create and eventually visualize the outcome.

According to Brinton "in a classification chart the facts, data etc. are arranged so that the place of each in relation to all others is readily seen. Quantities need not be given, although a quantitative analysis adds to the value of a classification chart."

Karsten (1923) explained, that "in all chart-making, the material to be shown must be accurately compiled before it can be charted. For an understanding of the classification chart, we must delve somewhat into the mysteries of the classification and indexing. The art of classification calls into play the power of visualizing a 'whole' together with its 'parts'."

== Examples ==
Early examples of classification chart are:

- The illustrations of the Carl Linnaeus' 1735 classification of animals and his classification of plants in his Classes Plantarum 1738.
- In 1752 Jean le Rond d'Alembert and Denis Diderot produced a figurative system of human knowledge produced for the Encyclopédie.
- Augustin Augier's "Arbre Botanique" (1801)
- In 1840 Edward Hitchcock inserted a paleontological chart in his Elementary Geology (1840). It shows a branching diagram of the plant and animal kingdom against a geological background.
- The tree of life image that appeared in Darwin's On the Origin of Species, 1859

Early classification chart are often visualized in a tree structure. Modern charts can also be presented in table or as an infographic.

The term "classification chart" came into use in the 20th century. In his 1939 Graphic presentation. (first edition 1919) Willard Cope Brinton was one of the first to devoted a whole chapter on classification charts.

== See also ==
- Chart
- Decision tree
- Decision tree learning
- Phylogenetic trees
- Tree of life (biology)
- Tree structure
