= Madrigal (poetry) =

Short lyrical poem about love

Madrigal (Italian: madrigale) is the name of a form of poetry, the exact nature of which has never been decided in English. It is one of the types of poetry in the 18th century figurative system of human knowledge of d'Alembert and Diderot.

Definition and Characteristics

The New English Dictionary defines a madrigal as "a short lyrical poem of amatory character", but this definition is broad and not entirely accurate. Madrigals can be long, and often deal with themes other than love.

The most notable English collection of madrigals not set to music was published by William Drummond of Hawthornden (1585–1649) in his 1616 Poems. Here is an example

The Beauty and the Life,
Of Lifes, and Beauties fairest Paragon,
(O Teares! ô Griefe!) hang at a feeble Thread,
To which pale Atropos had set her Knife,
The Soul with many a Grone
Had left each outward Part,
And now did take his last Leaue of the Heart,
Nought else did want, save Death, euen to be dead:
When the afflicted Band about her Bed
(Seeing so faire him come in Lips, Cheekes, Eyes)
Cried ah! and can Death enter Paradise?

— "Madrigal [iii]", from Poems, Second Part

This madrigals exemplifies the serious tone and irregular structure typical of Drummond's work, which includes about eighty such pieces.

Madrigal in French Literature

They are serious, brief, irregular lyrics, in which neither the amatory nor the complimentary tone is by any means obligatory. Some of these pieces contain as few as six lines, one as many as fourteen, but they average from nine to eleven. In the majority of examples, the little poem opens with a line of six syllables, and no line extends beyond ten syllables. The madrigal appears to be a short canzone of the Tuscan type, but less rigidly constructed. In French the madrigal has not this Italian character. It is simply a short piece of verse, ingenious in its turn and of a gallant tendency. The idea of compliment is essential. J. F. Guichard (1730–1811) writes: "Orgon, poke marital, A Venus compare sa femme; C'est pour la belle un madrigal, C'est pour Venus une epigramme."

This quatrain emphasizes the fact that in French a madrigal is a trifling piece of erotic compliment, neatly turned, but not seriously meant. The credit of inventing the old French verse form of madrigal belongs to Clément Marot, and one of his may be quoted in contrast to that of Drummond:

Un doux nenni avec un doux sourire
Est tant honneste, il le vous faut apprendre;
Quant est de oui, si veniez à le dire,
D'avoir trop dit je voudrois vous reprendre;
Non que je sois ennuyé d'entreprendre
D'avoir le fruit dont le désir me point;
Mais je voudrois qu'en ne le laissant prendre,
Vous me disiez: vous ne l'aurez point.

In English, when the word first occurred — it has not been traced further back than 1588 (in the preface to Nicholas Yonge's Musica transalpina) — it was identified with the chief form of secular vocal music in the 16th century. In 1741, John Immyns (1700–1764) founded the Madrigal Society, which met in an ale-house in Bride Lane, Fleet Street; this association still exists, and is the oldest musical society in Europe.

The word "madrigal" is frequently also used to designate a sentimental or trifling expression in a half-contemptuous sense.
