= Jeanne Julie Éléonore de Lespinasse =

French salon-holder, writer (1732–1779)

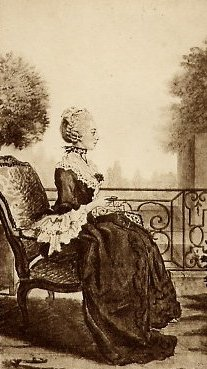
Julie de Lespinasse

Jeanne Julie Éléonore de Lespinasse (9 November 1732 – 23 May 1776) was a French salon holder and letter writer. She held a prominent salon in Paris during the Enlightenment. She is best-known today, however, for her letters, first published in 1809, which offer compelling accounts of two tragic love affairs.

== Early life ==
Julie-Jeanne-Éléonore de Lespinasse was born in Lyon, the illegitimate daughter of Julie-Claude-Hilaire d’Albon, who was the sole heir of an old family. Her mother, who was married to the Comte d'Albon, separated from her husband at the time of her birth, and the baby was baptized as the daughter of two fictitious persons, 'Claude Lespinasse' and his wife 'Julie Navarre'. The mystery of who her father really was did not get cleared up until her first careful biographer, the Marquis de Ségur (Pierre Marie Maurice Henri marquis de Ségur, 1853–1916), established that she was the daughter of Gaspard de Vichy-Chamrond, whose sister, Marie Anne de Vichy-Chamrond, marquise du Deffand, ran a famous Paris salon.

Looked down on for her poverty and illegitimate birth, Mlle de Lespinasse had an unhappy childhood marked by neglect. She acquired a basic education at a convent, but she was largely self-educated, an impressive feat given that she was later able to hold her own among France's top intellectuals. In 1754, Madame du Deffand, who recognized her niece's extraordinary gifts, persuaded her to come to Paris as her companion.

== The salons ==
Julie moved into Mme du Deffand's apartments in the Convent of St. Joseph, where Mme du Deffand's salon attracted diplomats, aristocrats, philosophers, and politicians. The relationship lasted ten years until 1764, when Mme du Deffand became jealous of the younger woman's increasing influence with the younger generation of salon attendees and a quarrel resulted.

Mlle de Lespinasse then set up a salon of her own that attracted many of the same people who had attended Mme du Deffand's salon. The mathematician and writer Jean le Rond d'Alembert became a close friend, joined her new salon, and eventually came to live in her house, although they were not romantically involved. This arrangement lent further influence to Mlle de Lespinasse's salon, which became a center for writers of the Encyclopédie. Diderot, for example, made her a protagonist of his controversial philosophical dialogues entitled D'Alembert's Dream. Although she had neither wealth nor rank and was not an outstanding beauty, Mlle de Lespinasse had intellect, charm, and ability as a hostess, qualities that made her salon gatherings the most popular in Paris. Her continuing notability is due less to her social success, however, than to a literary talent that remained a secret during her lifetime, even from her closest friends.

== Letters ==
Two volumes of Mlle de Lespinasse's letters, first published in 1809, displayed her as a writer of rare intensity. The literary critic Charles Augustin Sainte-Beuve ranks her letters with those by Héloïse and with the Letters of a Portuguese Nun (the latter now believed to be epistolary fiction rather than real letters). Other writers, focusing on her theme of passionate love rather than on genre, place her work alongside that of novelists such as Abbé Prévost and Jean-Jacques Rousseau.

Mlle de Lespinasse's letters center on her love for two men: Don José María Pignatelli y Gonzaga, Marquis de Mora, who was the son of Joaquín Pignatelli, Spanish ambassador in Paris, and Jacques-Antoine-Hippolyte, Comte de Guibert, a French general and writer. Less philosophical than such later eighteenth century letter writers as Madame de Stael, they offer a portrait of someone who saw herself as a tragic heroine sacrificing all for love.

=== Letters to the Marquis de Mora ===
Mlle de Lespinasse first met the Marquis de Mora about two years after establishing her own salon. Encountering him again two years later, she fell in love with him, and he fully returned her feelings. He began to suffer symptoms of tuberculosis, however, and returned to Spain for his health. Mlle de Lespinasse's letters reveal the pain she experienced from the separation and her anxiety over Mora's poor health. On the way back to Paris in 1774 to fulfill promises exchanged with Mlle de Lespinasse, the marquis died at Bordeaux at the age of 30.

=== Letters to the Comte de Guibert ===
Soon after the Marquis de Mora returned to Spain, Mlle de Lespinasse became acquainted with the man who would become the main passion of her life, the Comte de Guibert, then a colonel. Her letters to Guibert began in 1773 and soon record her as torn between her affection for Mora and her new infatuation. Later letters describe her partial disenchantment occasioned by Guibert's marriage to another woman in 1775 and her increasing despair.

== Death ==
By early 1776, Mlle de Lespinasse was in a state of mental and physical collapse, apparently caused by the misery of her relationship with Guibert. She had earlier shown depressive tendencies and a consequent dependence on opium may have aggravated her breakdown. On her deathbed, she refused to receive Guibert and instead, was watched over by her friend d'Alembert. She died on 22 May 1776 in Paris at the age of 43, possibly of tuberculosis. Her last words are said to have been "Am I still alive?"

== Publications ==
Following the first publication of Mlle de Lespinasse's Letters in 1809, a spurious additional collection appeared in 1820. Some later editions included a portrait of her written by her friend d'Alembert. Modern editions include that of Eugène Asse (1876–77). An 1887 collection edited M. Charles Henry, Lettres inédités de Mademoiselle de Lespinasse à Condorcet, à D'Alembert, à Guibert, au comte de Crillon, contains copies of the documents available for her biography.

In addition to the Letters, she was the author of two unpublished chapters intended as a kind of sequel to Laurence Sterne's Sentimental Journey.

== In popular culture ==
Julie Le Breton, a protagonist in Mary Augusta Ward's novel Lady Rose's Daughter is said to owe something to the character of Mlle de Lespinasse.

The novelist Naomi Royde-Smith wrote a well-received biography, The Double Heart: A Study of Julie de Lespinasse (1931).

== Bibliography ==
- Strachey, Lytton. Biographical Essays.
