= Tree of knowledge (philosophy) =

Metaphor used in philosophical analogies

The tree of knowledge or tree of philosophy is a metaphor presented by the French philosopher René Descartes in the preface to the French translation of his work Principles of Philosophy. He describes the relations among the different parts of philosophy (including natural philosophy) in a tree structure. The tree's roots are metaphysics, its trunk is physics, and its branches are all other "sciences" (including humanities), the principal of which are medicine, mechanics and morals. This image is often assumed to show Descartes's break with the past and with the categorization of knowledge of the schools.

== Description ==
Descartes is often regarded as the first thinker to emphasize the use of reason to develop the natural sciences. For him, philosophy was a thinking system that embodied all knowledge, as he related in a letter to a French translator:

Thus, all Philosophy is like a tree, of which Metaphysics is the root, Physics the trunk, and all the other sciences the branches that grow out of this trunk, which are reduced to three principals, namely, Medicine, Mechanics, and Ethics. By the science of Morals, I understand the highest and most perfect which, presupposing an entire knowledge of the other sciences, is the last degree of wisdom.

== See also ==
- Porphyrian tree
- Figurative system of human knowledge
