= Madame du Deffand =

French salon-holder (1696–1780)

Marie Anne de Vichy-Chamrond
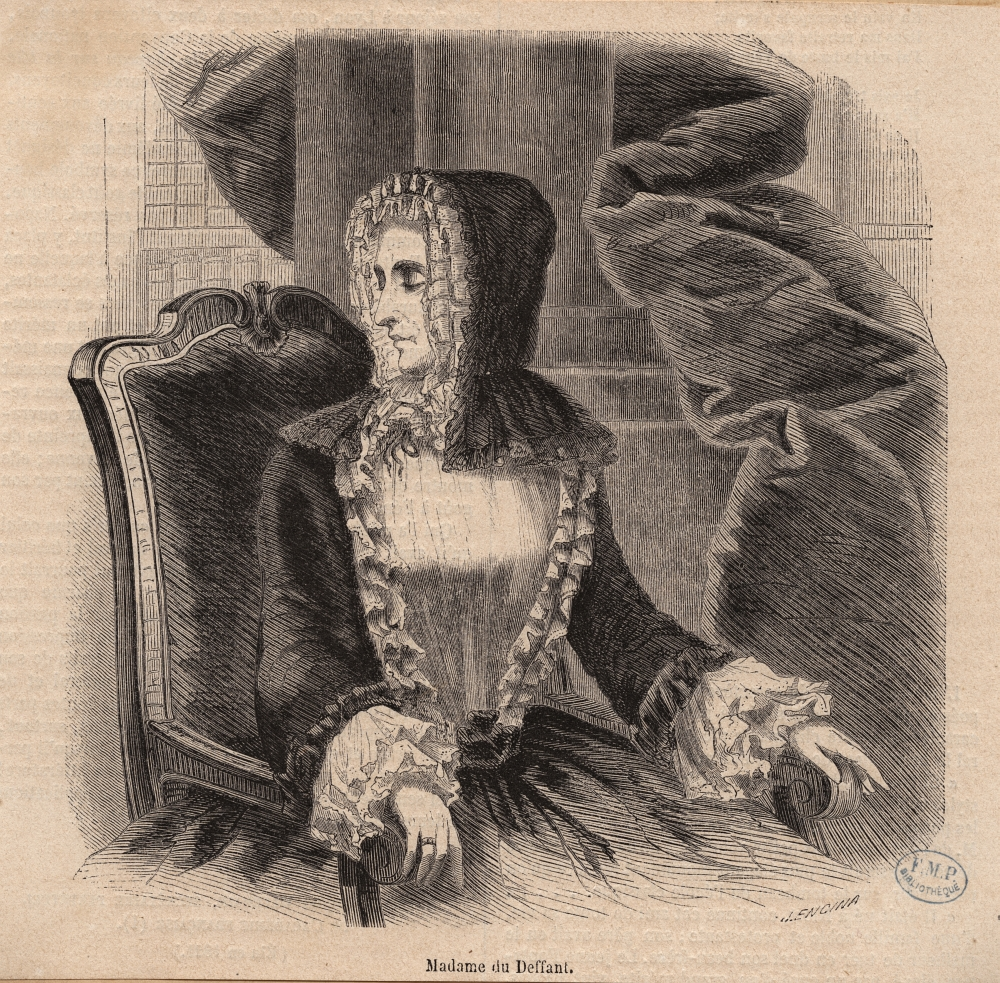
- Born: 25 September 1696; Château de Chamrond, Ligny-en-Brionnais
- Died: 23 September 1780 (aged 83)
- Title: Marquise du Deffand
- Spouse(s): Jean Baptiste de la Lande, marquis du Deffand (sep. 1722)

Marie Anne de Vichy-Chamrond, marquise du Deffand (25 September 1696 – 23 September 1780) was a French hostess and patron of the arts.

== Life ==
Madame du Deffand was born at the Château de Chamrond, in Ligny-en-Brionnais, a village near Charolles (département of Saône-et-Loire) of a noble family. Educated at a Benedictine convent in Paris, she showed great intelligence and a skeptical, cynical turn of mind. The abbess of the convent, alarmed at the freedom of her views, arranged for Jean Baptiste Massillon to visit and reason with her, but he accomplished nothing. At twenty-one years of age and without consulting her, her parents married her to her kinsman, Jean Baptiste de la Lande, marquis du Deffand. The marriage was an unhappy one and the couple separated in 1722.

Madame du Deffand is said by Horace Walpole (in a letter to Thomas Gray) to have been for a short time the mistress of the regent, the duke of Orléans. She appeared in her earlier days to be incapable of any strong attachment, but her intelligence, her cynicism, and her esprit made her the centre of attraction of a brilliant circle. In 1721 she began a friendship with Voltaire, but their regular correspondence dates only from 1736. She spent much time at Sceaux, at the court of the duchesse du Maine, where she contracted a close friendship with the president, Hénault. In Paris she attended the Club de l'Entresol and was the rival of Mme Geoffrin, but the members of her salon were drawn from aristocratic society more than from literary circles. There were exceptions: Voltaire, Montesquieu, Fontenelle, and Madame de Staal-Delaunay were among the habitués. When Hénault introduced D'Alembert, Madame du Deffand was captivated by him. She tolerated the encyclopaedists only for his sake.

In 1752 she retired from Paris, intending to remain in the country, but she was persuaded by her friends to return. She had taken up residence in 1747 in apartments in the Convent of Saint-Joseph in the rue Saint-Dominique, which had a separate entrance from the street. When she lost her sight in 1754, she engaged Mademoiselle de Lespinasse to help her in entertaining. This lady's wit made some of the guests, including D'Alembert, prefer her society to that of Madame du Deffand, and Mademoiselle de Lespinasse received visitors for an hour before her patron appeared. When this was discovered, Mademoiselle de Lespinasse was dismissed (1764), and the salon broke up, for she took with her D'Alembert, Turgot, and the literary clique. From this time Madame du Deffand very rarely received any literary visitors. The principal friendships of her later years were with the duchesse de Choiseul and with Horace Walpole, the latter becoming the strongest and longest-lasting of all her attachments. In this period, she developed qualities of style and eloquence of which her earlier writings had given little promise. In the opinion of Sainte-Beuve the prose of her letters ranks with that of Voltaire as the best of that classical epoch, without excepting any even of the great writers.

Walpole refused at first to acknowledge the closeness of their intimacy from an exaggerated fear of the ridicule attaching to her age, but he paid several visits to Paris expressly for the purpose of enjoying her society, and maintained a close and most interesting correspondence with her for fifteen years. On her death, she left her dog, Tonton, to the care of Walpole, who also was entrusted with her papers. Of her innumerable witty sayings the best known is her remark on the cardinal de Polignac's account of St Denis's miraculous walk of two miles with his head in his hands--Il n'y a que le premier pas qui coûte (The distance doesn't matter; it is only the first step that is the most difficult.).

== Correspondence ==
The Correspondance inédite of Madame du Deffand with D'Alembert, Hénault, Montesquieu, and others was published in Paris (2 vols.) in 1809. Letters of the marquise du Deffand to the Hon. Horace Walpole, afterwards earl of Orford, from the year 1766 to the year 1780 (4vols.), edited, with a biographical sketch, by Miss Mary Berry, were published in London from the originals at Strawberry Hill in 1810.

The standard edition of her letters is in the Yale Edition of Horace Walpole's Correspondence, vols. 9–10, edited by Wilmarth S. Lewis. Other papers of Mme du Deffand obtained at the breaking up of Walpole's collection are in private hands. Mme du Deffand returned many of Walpole's letters at his request, and subsequently destroyed those she received from him. Those in his possession appear to have been destroyed after his death by Miss Berry, who printed fragments from them as footnotes to the edition of 1810. The correspondence between Walpole and Madame du Deffand thus remains one-sided, but seven of Walpole's letters to her were printed for the first time in the edition (1903) of his correspondence by Mrs Paget Toynbee, who discovered a quantity of her unedited letters. See Sainte-Beuve, Causeries du lundi, vols. i. and xiv.; and the notice by Lescure in his edition of the correspondence.
