= Claudine Guérin de Tencin =

French salonist and author

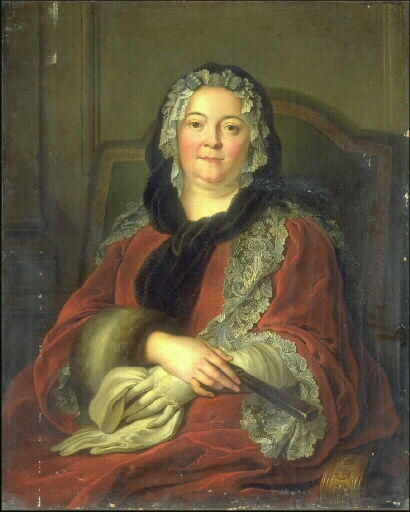
Claudine Alexandrine Guérin de Tencin

Claudine Alexandrine Guérin de Tencin, Baroness of Saint-Martin-de-Ré /ɡəˈræn də ˌtɒnˈsæn/ (27 April 1682 – 4 December 1749) was a French salonist and author. She was the mother of Jean le Rond d'Alembert, who later became a prominent mathematician, philosophe and contributor to the Encyclopédie, though she left him on the steps of the Church of Saint-Jean-le-Rond on the north side of Notre Dame cathedral a few days after his birth in November 1717.

== Early life ==
Claudine was born in Grenoble, Dauphiné, France where her father, Antoine Guérin, sieur de Tencin, was president of the parlement. Claudine was brought up at a convent near Grenoble and, at the wish of her parents, took the veil but broke her vows and succeeded, in 1712, in gaining formal permission from Pope Clement XI for her secularisation. She is reputed to have had a liaison, while still formally a nun, with the Irish exile soldier Arthur Dillon.

== Life as a socialite ==
She joined her sister Mme. de Ferriol in Paris, where she soon established a salon, frequented by wits and roués. Among her numerous lovers and benefactors was the Chevalier Louis-Camus Destouches, by whom she had an illegitimate son, Jean le Rond d'Alembert. The newborn boy was left on the steps of a church. Guillaume Dubois, the future First Minister was reportedly another of her lovers, even after he became Archbishop of Cambrai; but the affair, if it existed, was conducted with discretion.

One of her liaisons did have a tragic ending. In 1726 a former lover Charles-Joseph de la Fresnaye committed suicide in her house, and Mme. de Tencin spent some time in the Châtelet and then in the Bastille in consequence, but was soon liberated as the result of a declaration of her innocence by the Grand Conseil.

From this time she devoted herself to political intrigue, especially for the preferment of her brother the abbé Tencin, who became archbishop of Lyon and received a cardinal's hat. The nature of her relationship with her brother was a subject of much speculation, but although she never troubled to deny the rumours, there seems to be no evidence that their affection was more than fraternal.

She also was involved with King Louis XV's best friend, the Maréchal de Richelieu, over whom she allegedly exercised considerable control. The correspondence between Claudine, her brother and Richelieu shows a deep involvement in the behind-the-scenes intrigues at Louis XV's court at Versailles.

Eventually, she formed a literary salon, which had among its habitués Bernard le Bovier de Fontenelle, Charles de Secondat, Baron de Montesquieu, Charles-Irénée Castel de Saint-Pierre, Pierre de Marivaux, Alexis Piron and others.

Hers was the first of the Parisian literary salons which admitted distinguished foreigners. Among her English guests were Henry St John, 1st Viscount Bolingbroke and Philip Stanhope, 4th Earl of Chesterfield.

== Novels ==
She was a novelist of considerable merit. Her novels have been highly praised for their simplicity and charm, the last qualities the circumstances of the writer's life would lead one to expect in her work. The best of them is Mémoires du comte de Comminge (1735), which was believed to have been written, as were the other two ("Le Siège de Calais" and "Les Malheurs de l’amour"), by her nephews, MM. d'Argental and Pont de Veyle, the real authorship being carefully concealed.

Her works, with those of Marie-Madeleine de La Fayette, were edited by Etienne and Jay (Paris, 1825); her novels were reprinted, with introductory matter by Lescure, in 1885; and her correspondence in the Lettres de Mmes. de Villars, de La Fayette et de Tencin (Paris, 1805–1832).
