= D'Alembert's Dream =

Philosophical dialogues by Denis Diderot

d'Alembert's Dream
- Author: Denis Diderot
- Original title: Le Rêve de d'Alembert
- Language: French
- Publication date: 1830
- Publication place: France

d'Alembert's Dream (or The Dream of d'Alembert, French: Le Rêve de d'Alembert) is an ensemble of three philosophical dialogues authored by Denis Diderot in 1769, which first anonymously appeared in the Correspondance littéraire, philosophique et critique between August and November 1782, but was not published in its own right until 1830:

- The Continuation of a Conversation between d'Alembert and Diderot (La Suite d'un entretien entre M. Diderot et M. d'Alembert)
- d'Alembert's Dream (Le Rêve de d'Alembert)
- Continuation of the Preceding Conversation (Suite de l'entretien précédent )

Diderot did not give a name to the ensemble of the three dialogues, but they are traditionally referred to by the name of the second and longest dialogue, d'Alembert's Dream.

d'Alembert's Dream was one of Diderot's favorite works, and has been thought of as one of his most important philosophical texts. In the dialogues, Diderot is at the zenith of his development of materialist theories. It is here that he introduces his theory on life and nature, indicating that matter is not fixed but, on the contrary, subject to evolution. Each species in existence transforms itself and gives birth to a new species.

He would later create a special version for his patroness, Catherine II of Russia, replacing certain characters' names.

== Background ==
Diderot had ended his 1756 work On the interpretation of Nature with a list of questions that remained unresolved in his inquiry into the origin and nature of organic life. Over the course of the next fifteen years, he studied recent medical knowledge, becoming interested in the work of Buffon, Albrecht von Haller, and Jean-Baptiste Robinet, discussing medicine with the physicians to whom he was connected through his entourage, such as Antoine Petit, Théodore Tronchin, and Théophile de Bordeu (who would appear as one of the interlocutors in the dialogues), following a course on surgery, and examining anatomical models from the likes of Marie Marguerite Bihéron. D'Alembert's Dream synthesizes the knowledge gained from these years of study into a text that offers tentative answers to the questions raised in his earlier work.

It has further been suggested that d'Alembert's Dream was influenced by Diderot's recent reading of Lucretius’s De rerum natura, the author having aided Nicolas La Grange in his 1768 translation of the work. Diderot originally considered an ancient setting, with Leucippus, Democritus, and Hippocrates as the interlocutors, but opted for a modern setting in the interest of verisimilitude.

The text circulated among some of Diderot's close associates throughout 1769. Word got out to Julie de Lespinasse and d'Alembert, who took poorly to being used as protagonists of the conversations. At d'Alembert's request, Diderot destroyed his copies of the dialogues, but at least one additional copy existed in the possession of Friedrich Melchior, Baron von Grimm, editor of the Correspondance littéraire. (The possibility has also been suggested that Diderot secretly preserved a copy in his own possession.)

Grimm's successor convinced Diderot to allow circulation of the work in the Correspondance littéraire in 1782, Julie de l'Espinasse having died in 1776, and d'Alembert having largely withdrawn from public and social life. Upon Diderot's death in 1784, his daughter, Marie Angélique de Vandeul, sent his papers to Catherine II of Russia, in accordance with an agreement made during Diderot's life. Based upon a manuscript copy of the dialogues among these papers, print editions of the book were produced starting in 1830. After the discovery of an alternate copy of the dialogues among the papers of Marie Angélique de Vandeul after her death, it was found that the copy sent to Catherine II was a faulty copy of a prior manuscript in Diderot's hand. This superior manuscript that had remained in the possession of de Vandeul until her death has been used as the basis for editions of the dialogues since 1951.

== Summary ==
=== First dialogue ===
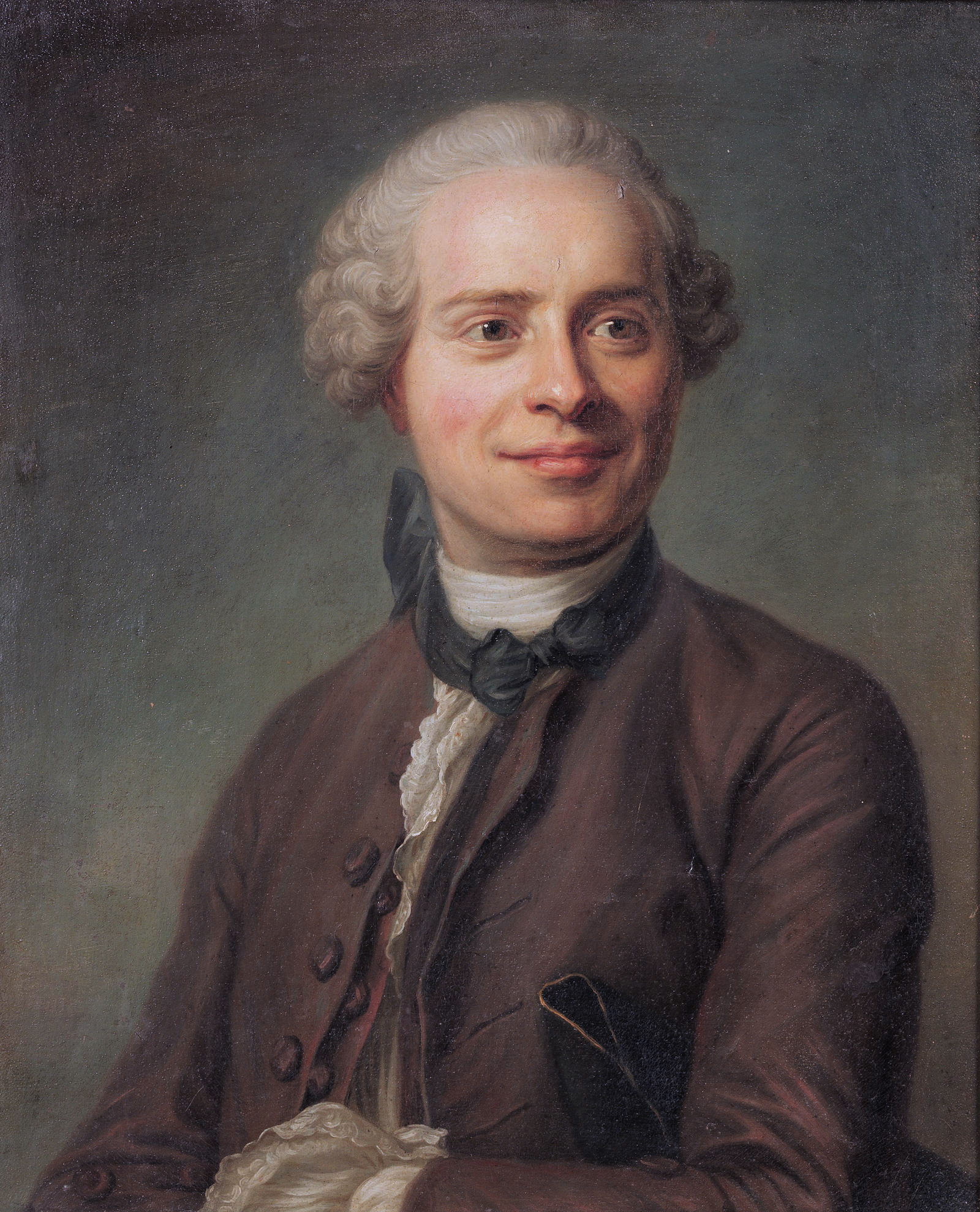
Jean le Rond d'Alembert

The dialogue opens upon a discussion that Diderot and d'Alembert are having in which Diderot, in arguing for his materialist, monist view of the universe, asserts his belief that sensation is not restricted to sentient beings but is, rather, a quality of all matter. On Diderot's account, sensation is like energy. Energy can exist in a potential state, as when an object is at rest, or, in a kinetic state, as when an object is actually set in motion. Similarly, in Diderot's view, sensation can exist in a potential state (as in nonliving substances) or in an actual state (as in sentient beings.) An example Diderot offers is of marble, which, he claims, if ground up and added to soil, can be converted into nutrients by plants, which may in turn be consumed by humans, and thus made part of a sentient body, thereby actualizing the original marble's potential for sensation. He also offers the example of the molecules that come to make up the sex cells of d'Alembert's mother and father, which then come to form part of d'Alembert's body. Diderot takes the opportunity of this last example to ridicule the notion of pre-existent germs (the notion that the sex cells contain all future generations nested within one another,) advocating instead for epigenesis.

Diderot, propelled by questions from d'Alembert, goes on to explain his materialist conception of thought and memory. He likens the human organs to musical instruments, whose fibers are like sympathetic strings that vibrate in response to one another. A thought causes the vibration of certain fibers, and the vibration of those fibers can cause the vibration of other fibers. This is Diderot's explanation of the association of ideas. Memory is explained by a comparison to a string which continues to vibrate even after other strings have stopped vibrating. Thus both sensation and thought are explained without reference to intervention by any immaterial force.

The dialogue ends as the two friends reach d'Alembert's apartment and bid each other goodnight.

=== Second dialogue ===
The second dialogue takes place the next morning at d'Alembert's apartment, where the sleeping d'Alembert is being watched over by Mademoiselle de l’Espinasse. She has called for the doctor Bordeu, and explains to him that d'Alembert returned the previous night in an agitated state, and that when he went to sleep he started dreaming, ranting without waking up about some of the topics that had been broached in the conversation with Diderot.

She wrote down what he said as he was dreaming, and the remainder of the dialogue takes the form of a conversation between l’Espinasse and Bordeu, in which she often reads from her notes of d'Alembert's somniloquy, with occasional interventions by the sleeping or waking d'Alembert.

The first problem addressed is that of the unity of multi-cellular organisms. How can the unification of many tiny living cells add up to a being with a sense of individuality, like a human? Traditional explanations reference the soul, but this dialogue attempts to offer a materialist account. Between the three interlocutors, the example is put forward of a cluster of bees on a branch, in which stimulating one bee incites that bee to move and stimulate her neighbors, which move in turn, and so on, such that the cluster as a whole reacts to stimulation in any part of it. At this point, in an aside, the dreaming d'Alembert expresses his support for John Turberville Needham's theory of spontaneous generation, which would explain the existence of life without need of divine intervention.

L’Espinasse, addressing the problem of the unity of the organism, goes on to offer the analogy of a spider at the center of its web. Just as the spider reacts to its web being touched, so some part of the brain can feel and react to stimulation in the various parts of the body. Expanding upon the idea of the body as a bundle of threads, Bordeu describes many cases of bodily deformity, explaining how in each case the reason for the deformity was a physical derangement or damage of part of the body's physical network of fibers. He also references a trepanning patient whose brain function changes depending on whether or not pressure is being applied to his brain, emphasizing the physical, material basis of thought and action.

After various other digressions and reflections, the dialogue ends with l’Espinasse inviting Bordeu to lunch, anticipating the mise en scène of the final dialogue.

=== Third dialogue ===
The dialogue starts with Mademoiselle de l’Espinasse offering Bordeu a glass of Malaga after lunch. D'Alembert is out, having gone to eat elsewhere.

L’Espinasse asks Bordeu his opinion on bestiality. Bordeu responds by pleading that acts that give pleasure without causing harm ought not to be censured. He sees masturbation as healthy, but condemns chastity as harmful. His position is that there is no reason to condemn a sexual act that gives pleasure to both parties, as long as it causes no harm, even if the participants are of different species. His argument also suggests that there is nothing wrong with homosexual acts.

Bordeu concludes by exploring the possibility of creating new, useful species of animal through interspecies sex and procreation.
