= Louis-Camus Destouches =

Portrait of Louis-Camus Destouches by Hyacinthe Rigaud, 1707

Louis-Camus Destouches (1668 – 11 March 1726), usually called Destouches-Canon, was an artillery General in the French Royal Army.

== Military career ==
Destouches was a lieutenant-general of the artillery in the Royal Army. He served under Kings Louis XIV and Louis XV, gaining the nickname Canon. He became a chevalier of the ordre de Saint-Lazare in 1690, and a chevalier of the ordre de Saint-Louis in 1720, then commandeur in 1725.

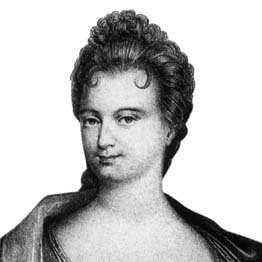
Madame de Tencin

== Family ==
From an affair with his mistress Claudine Guérin de Tencin, Destouches fathered a child in 1717. In later life, this son would become famous as Jean le Rond d'Alembert, mathematician, philosophe, and co-editor of the Encyclopédie. At first, the child was abandoned to the Church by its mother, but Destouches arranged to have him raised privately by a family of the artisanal class. Destouches then secretly funded his illegitimate son's education, and when he died in Paris in 1726, he left d'Alembert a healthy income of 1,200 livres a year.

== Works (Selection) ==
Instructions for the service of a cannon at a siege. Metz 1720
