= Economic forces =

Economic forces are the factors that help to determine the competitiveness of the environment in which the firm operates.

These factors include:

1. Unemployment level
2. Inflation rate
3. Fiscal policies
4. Government changes

These factors determine an enterprise’s volume of demand for its product and affect its marketing strategies and activities. The economic system is made up of three main steps. The first one being production and then there is distribution of the produced goods and then the last step is consumption of the same. Now all this is possible because of two factors- Human resource and Natural resource.
