= Ligny-en-Brionnais =

- Commune
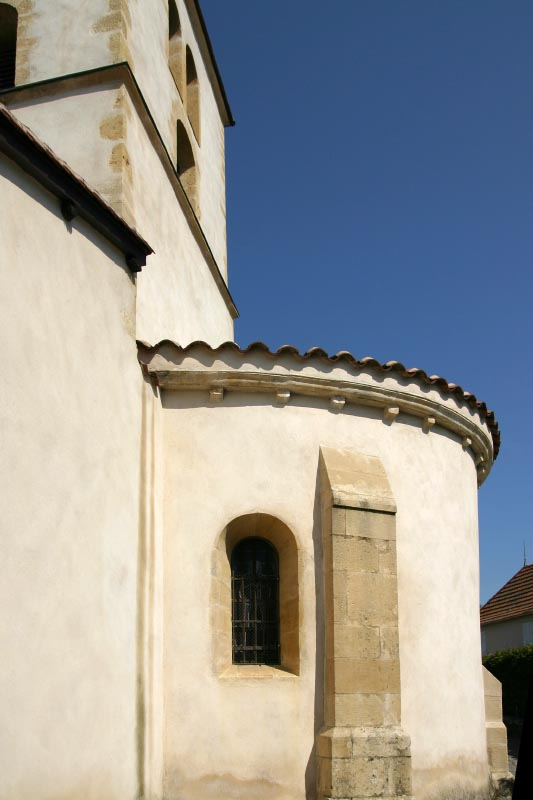
- Part of the church in Ligny-en-Brionnais
- Location of Ligny-en-Brionnais
- Location within France Location within Bourgogne-Franche-Comté
- Coordinates: 46°14′18″N 4°11′25″E
- Country: France
- Region: Bourgogne-Franche-Comté
- Department: Saône-et-Loire
- Arrondissement: Charolles
- Canton: Chauffailles
- Intercommunality: Semur en Brionnais

Government
  - Mayor (2020–2026): Gérard Pegon
- Area^{1}: 15.94 km^{2} (6.15 sq mi)
- Elevation: 370 m (1,210 ft)
- Highest elevation: 508 m (1,667 ft)
- Lowest elevation: 327 m (1,073 ft)
- Population (2023): 375
  - Density: 23.5/km^{2} (60.9/sq mi)
- Time zone: UTC+01:00 (CET)
  - Summer (DST): UTC+02:00 (CEST)
- INSEE/Postal code: 71259 /71110
- ^{1} French Land Register data, which excludes lakes, ponds, glaciers > 1 km^{2} (0.386 sq mi or 247 acres) and river estuaries.

Ligny-en-Brionnais (French pronunciation: [liɲi ɑ̃ bʁijɔnɛ]) is a commune in the Saône-et-Loire department in the region of Bourgogne-Franche-Comté in eastern France.

== Population ==
Historical population
Year	Pop.	±% p.a.
1968	383	—
1975	332	−2.02%
1982	325	−0.30%
1990	298	−1.08%
1999	295	−0.11%
2007	347	+2.05%
2012	346	−0.06%
2017	340	−0.35%
2023	375	+1.65%
Source: INSEE

== See also ==
- Communes of the Saône-et-Loire department
