= On the Interpretation of Nature =

1754 book by Denis Diderot

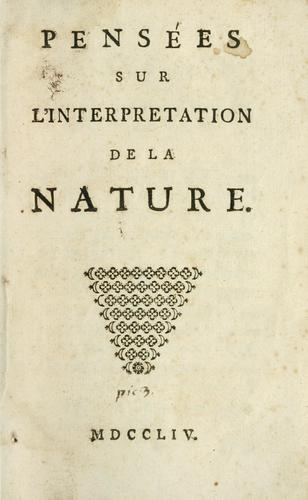
Pensees sur l'interpretation de la nature

On the Interpretation of Nature (or Thoughts on the Interpretation of Nature, French: Pensées sur l'interprétation de la nature) is a 1754 book written by Denis Diderot.

In this work Diderot expounds on his views about nature, evolution, materialism, mathematics, and experimental science.

== Content ==
=== Nature and Evolution ===
The book begins with the statement: "It is nature that I wish to describe [ecrire]; nature is the only book for the philosopher." Diderot conceives of nature as operating on matter and giving rise to various life forms.

In the cosmic laboratory of nature, writes Diderot, numerous species have arisen and perished. As conceptualized by Diderot, Nature works on the life forms it has given rise to by improving upon or discarding specific organs of the life form. Everything is matter; matter includes within it the potential of consciousness; body and soul are one and die together. Nature cares for the species rather than for the individual; it lets the individual reproduce and then die. Nature is neutral and blind; she makes no distinction between saints and sinners, and destroys both fools and philosophers.

On the question of evolution, Diderot writes:

Just as in the animal and plant kingdoms an individual begins,...grows, endures, perishes, and passes away, could it not be likewise with entire species? If faith did not teach us that animals come from the hands of the Creator such as we see them, and if it were allowed to have the least doubt of their commencement and their end, might not the philosopher, abandoned to his conjectures, suppose that animality had from all eternity its particular elements, scattered and confounded in the mass of matter; that these elements happened to unite, since it was possible for this to happen; that the embryo formed from these elements passed through an infinity of organizations and developments; that it acquired in succession movement, sensation, ideas, thought, reflection, consciousness, feelings, passions, signs, gestures, articulate sounds, language, laws, sciences, and arts; that millions of years passed between these developments; that perhaps it [the organism] has still further developments to undergo, other additions to receive, now unknown to us;...that it may lose these faculties as it acquired them; that it may forever disappear from nature, or, rather, continue to exist under a form, and with faculties, quite other than those which we notice in it in this moment of time.

=== Mathematics and Experimental Science ===
The book extolls the natural sciences and the role played by experience (Note: The French word experience means both "experience" and "experiment.") in developing the natural sciences. It denounces mathematics, more specifically it criticizes the kind of mathematics which yields no new knowledge and is "useless". It is critical of "useless experiments" and mathematical assumptions that are contrary to the laws of nature; and the approach of treating mathematics as a game that has nothing to do with nature. Mathematicians like to criticize other thinkers for being metaphysicians, writes Diderot, but increasingly chemists, physicists, and naturalists are directing the same criticism at them.

In his book, Diderot focuses on the role of conjecture in the natural sciences. By conjecture Diderot means the ability of an experimental philosopher to "sniff out" new methods and processes; he examines the question of whether this ability can be passed on from one person to another.
