= D'Alembert's formula =

Mathematical solution

In mathematics, and specifically partial differential equations (PDEs), d'Alembert's formula is the general solution to the one-dimensional wave equation:

$$u_{tt}-c^2u_{xx}=0,\, u(x,0)=g(x),\, u_t(x,0)=h(x),$$

for $-\infty < x<\infty,\,\, t>0$

It is named after the mathematician Jean le Rond d'Alembert, who derived it in 1747 as a solution to the problem of a vibrating string.

== Details ==
The characteristics of the PDE are $x \pm ct = \mathrm{const}$ (where $\pm$ sign states the two solutions to quadratic equation), so we can use the change of variables $\mu = x + ct$ (for the positive solution) and $\eta = x-ct$ (for the negative solution) to transform the PDE to $u_{\mu\eta} = 0$. The general solution of this PDE is $u(\mu,\eta) = F(\mu) + G(\eta)$ where $F$ and $G$ are $C^1$ functions. Back in $x, t$ coordinates,

$$u(x,t) = F(x+ct) + G(x-ct)$$

where $u$ is $C^2$ if $F$ and $G$ are $C^2$.

This solution $u$ can be interpreted as two waves with constant velocity $c$ moving in opposite directions along the x-axis.

Now consider this solution with the Cauchy data $u(x,0)=g(x), u_t(x,0)=h(x)$.

Using $u(x,0) = g(x)$ we get $F(x) + G(x) = g(x)$.

Using $u_t(x,0) = h(x)$ we get $cF'(x)-cG'(x) = h(x)$.

We can integrate the last equation to get
$$cF(x)-cG(x)=\int_{-\infty}^x h(\xi) \, d\xi + c_1.$$

Now we can solve this system of equations to get
$$F(x) = \frac{-1}{2c}\left(-cg(x)-\left(\int_{-\infty}^x h(\xi) \, d\xi +c_1 \right)\right)$$
$$G(x) = \frac{-1}{2c}\left(-cg(x)+\left(\int_{-\infty}^x h(\xi) d\xi +c_1 \right)\right).$$

Now, using
$$u(x,t) = F(x+ct)+G(x-ct)$$

d'Alembert's formula becomes:
$$u(x,t) = \frac{1}{2}\left[g(x-ct) + g(x+ct)\right] + \frac{1}{2c} \int_{x-ct}^{x+ct} h(\xi) \, d\xi.$$

== Generalization for inhomogeneous canonical hyperbolic differential equations ==
The general form of an inhomogeneous canonical hyperbolic type differential equation takes the form of:
$$u_{tt} - c^2 u_{xx} = f(x,t),\, u(x,0)=g(x),\, u_t(x,0)=h(x),$$
for $-\infty < x < \infty, \,\, t > 0, f \in C^2(\R^2,\R)$.

All second order differential equations with constant coefficients can be transformed into their respective canonic forms. This equation is one of these three cases: Elliptic partial differential equation, Parabolic partial differential equation and Hyperbolic partial differential equation.

The only difference between a homogeneous and an inhomogeneous (partial) differential equation is that in the homogeneous form we only allow 0 to stand on the right side ($f(x,t) = 0$), while the inhomogeneous one is much more general, as in $f(x,t)$ could be any function as long as it's continuous and can be continuously differentiated twice.

The solution of the above equation is given by the formula:
$$u(x,t) = \frac{1}{2}\bigl( g(x+ct) + g(x-ct)\bigr) + \frac{1}{2c} \int_{x-ct}^{x+ct} h(s)\, ds + \frac{1}{2c} \int_0^t \int_{x-c(t-\tau)}^{x+c(t-\tau)} f(s,\tau) \, ds \, d\tau .$$

If $g(x) = 0$, the first part disappears, if $h(x) = 0$, the second part disappears, and if $f(x) = 0$, the third part disappears from the solution, since integrating the 0-function between any two bounds always results in 0.

== See also ==
- D'Alembert operator
- Mechanical wave
- Wave equation
