= D'Alembert–Euler condition =

In mathematics and physics, especially the study of mechanics and fluid dynamics, the d'Alembert-Euler condition is a requirement that the streaklines of a flow are irrotational. Let x = x(X,t) be the coordinates of the point x into which X is carried at time t by a (fluid) flow. Let $\ddot{\mathbf{x}}=\frac{D^2\mathbf{x}}{Dt}$ be the second material derivative of x. Then the d'Alembert-Euler condition is:
$$\mathrm{curl}\  \mathbf{x}=\mathbf{0}. \,$$

The d'Alembert-Euler condition is named for Jean le Rond d'Alembert and Leonhard Euler who independently first described its use in the mid-18th century. It is not to be confused with the Cauchy–Riemann conditions.
