= Reduction of order =

Technique for solving linear ordinary differential equations

Reduction of order (or d’Alembert reduction) is a technique in mathematics for solving second-order linear ordinary differential equations. It is employed when one solution $y_1(x)$ is known and a second linearly independent solution $y_2(x)$ is desired. The method also applies to n-th order equations. In this case the ansatz will yield an (n−1)-th order equation for $v$.

== Second-order linear ordinary differential equations ==
=== An example ===
Consider the general, homogeneous, second-order linear constant coefficient ordinary differential equation. (ODE)
$$a y''(x) + b y'(x) + c y(x) = 0,$$
where $a, b, c$ are real non-zero coefficients. Two linearly independent solutions for this ODE can be straightforwardly found using characteristic equations except for the case when the discriminant, $b^2 - 4 a c$, vanishes. In this case,
$$a y''(x) + b y'(x) + \frac{b^2}{4a} y(x) = 0,$$
from which only one solution,
$$y_1(x) = e^{-\frac{b}{2a} x},$$
can be found using its characteristic equation.

The method of reduction of order is used to obtain a second linearly independent solution to this differential equation using our one known solution. To find a second solution we take as a guess
$$y_2(x) = v(x) y_1(x)$$
where $v(x)$ is an unknown function to be determined. Since $y_2(x)$ must satisfy the original ODE, we substitute it back in to get
$$a \left( v'' y_1 + 2 v' y_1' + v y_1'' \right) + b \left( v' y_1 + v y_1' \right) + \frac{b^2}{4a} v y_1 = 0.$$
Rearranging this equation in terms of the derivatives of $v(x)$ we get
$$\left(a y_1 \right) v'' + \left( 2 a y_1' + b y_1 \right) v' + \left( a y_1'' + b y_1' + \frac{b^2}{4a} y_1 \right) v = 0.$$

Since we know that $y_1(x)$ is a solution to the original problem, the coefficient of the last term is equal to zero. Furthermore, substituting $y_1(x)$ into the second term's coefficient yields (for that coefficient)
$$2 a \left( - \frac{b}{2a} e^{-\frac{b}{2a} x} \right) + b e^{-\frac{b}{2a} x} = \left( -b + b \right) e^{-\frac{b}{2a} x} = 0.$$

Therefore, we are left with
$$a y_1 v'' = 0.$$

Since $a$ is assumed non-zero and $y_1(x)$ is an exponential function (and thus always non-zero), we have
$$v'' = 0.$$

This can be integrated twice to yield
$$v(x) = c_1 x + c_2$$
where $c_1, c_2$ are constants of integration. We now can write our second solution as
$$y_2(x) = ( c_1 x + c_2 ) y_1(x) = c_1 x y_1(x) + c_2 y_1(x).$$

Since the second term in $y_2(x)$ is a scalar multiple of the first solution (and thus linearly dependent) we can drop that term, yielding a final solution of
$$y_2(x) = x y_1(x) = x e^{-\frac{b}{2 a} x}.$$

Finally, we can prove that the second solution $y_2(x)$ found via this method is linearly independent of the first solution by calculating the Wronskian
$$W(y_1,y_2)(x) = \begin{vmatrix} y_1 & x y_1 \\ y_1' & y_1 + x y_1' \end{vmatrix} = y_1 ( y_1 + x y_1' ) - x y_1 y_1' = y_1^{2} + x y_1 y_1' - x y_1 y_1' = y_1^{2} = e^{-\frac{b}{a}x} \neq 0.$$

Thus $y_2(x)$ is the second linearly independent solution we were looking for.

=== General method ===
Given the general non-homogeneous linear differential equation
$$y'' + p(t)y' + q(t)y = r(t)$$
and a single solution $y_1(t)$ of the homogeneous equation [$r(t)=0$], let us try a solution of the full non-homogeneous equation in the form:
$$y_2 = v(t)y_1(t)$$
where $v(t)$ is an arbitrary function. Thus
$$y_2' = v'(t)y_1(t) + v(t)y_1'(t)$$
and
$$y_2'' = v''(t)y_1(t) + 2v'(t)y_1'(t) + v(t)y_1''(t).$$

If these are substituted for $y$, $y'$, and $y''$ in the differential equation, then
$$y_1(t)\,v'' + (2y_1'(t)+p(t)y_1(t))\,v' + (y_1''(t)+p(t)y_1'(t)+q(t)y_1(t))\,v = r(t).$$

Since $y_1(t)$ is a solution of the original homogeneous differential equation, $y_1''(t)+p(t)y_1'(t) + q(t) y_1(t) = 0$, so we can reduce to
$$y_1(t)\,v'' + (2y_1'(t)+p(t)y_1(t))\,v' = r(t)$$
which is a first-order differential equation for $v'(t)$ (reduction of order). Divide by $y_1(t)$, obtaining
$$v''+\left(\frac{2y_1'(t)}{y_1(t)}+p(t)\right)\,v'=\frac{r(t)}{y_1(t)}.$$

One integrating factor is given by $\mu(t)=e^{\int(\frac{2y_1'(t)}{y_1(t)}+p(t))dt}$, and because

$$\int \left(\frac{2y_1'(t)}{y_1(t)} + p(t)\right)\,dt =
2 \int \frac{y_1'(t)}{y_1(t)}\,dt + \int p(t)\,dt =
2 \ln(y_1(t)) + \int p(t)\,dt =  \ln(y_1^2(t)) + \int p(t)\,dt,$$

this integrating factor can be more neatly expressed as $\mu(t) = e^{\ln(y_1^2(t)) + \int p(t)\,dt} = y_1^2(t)e^{\int p(t) dt}.$ Multiplying the differential equation by the integrating factor $\mu(t)$, the equation for $v(t)$ can be reduced to
$$\frac{d}{dt}\left(v'(t) y_1^2(t) e^{\int p(t) dt}\right) = y_1(t)r(t)e^{\int p(t) dt}.$$

After integrating the last equation, $v'(t)$ is found, containing one constant of integration. Then, integrate $v'(t)$ to find the full solution of the original non-homogeneous second-order equation, exhibiting two constants of integration as it should:
$$y_2(t) = v(t)y_1(t).$$

== See also ==
- Variation of parameters
