= Darjeeling Hills University =

Public university in West Bengal, India

- Other names: DHU
- Former names: Greenfield University
- Motto: Excellence · Inclusion · Innovation
- Type: Public
- Established: 2021; 5 years ago
- Accreditation: University Grants Commission Act, 1956
- Affiliations: UGC
- Chancellor: Governor of West Bengal
- Vice-Chancellor: Tejimala Gurung Nag
- Location: Mungpoo, Darjeeling, West Bengal, 734313, India
- Campus: Semi-Urban
- Website: www.dhu.edu.in

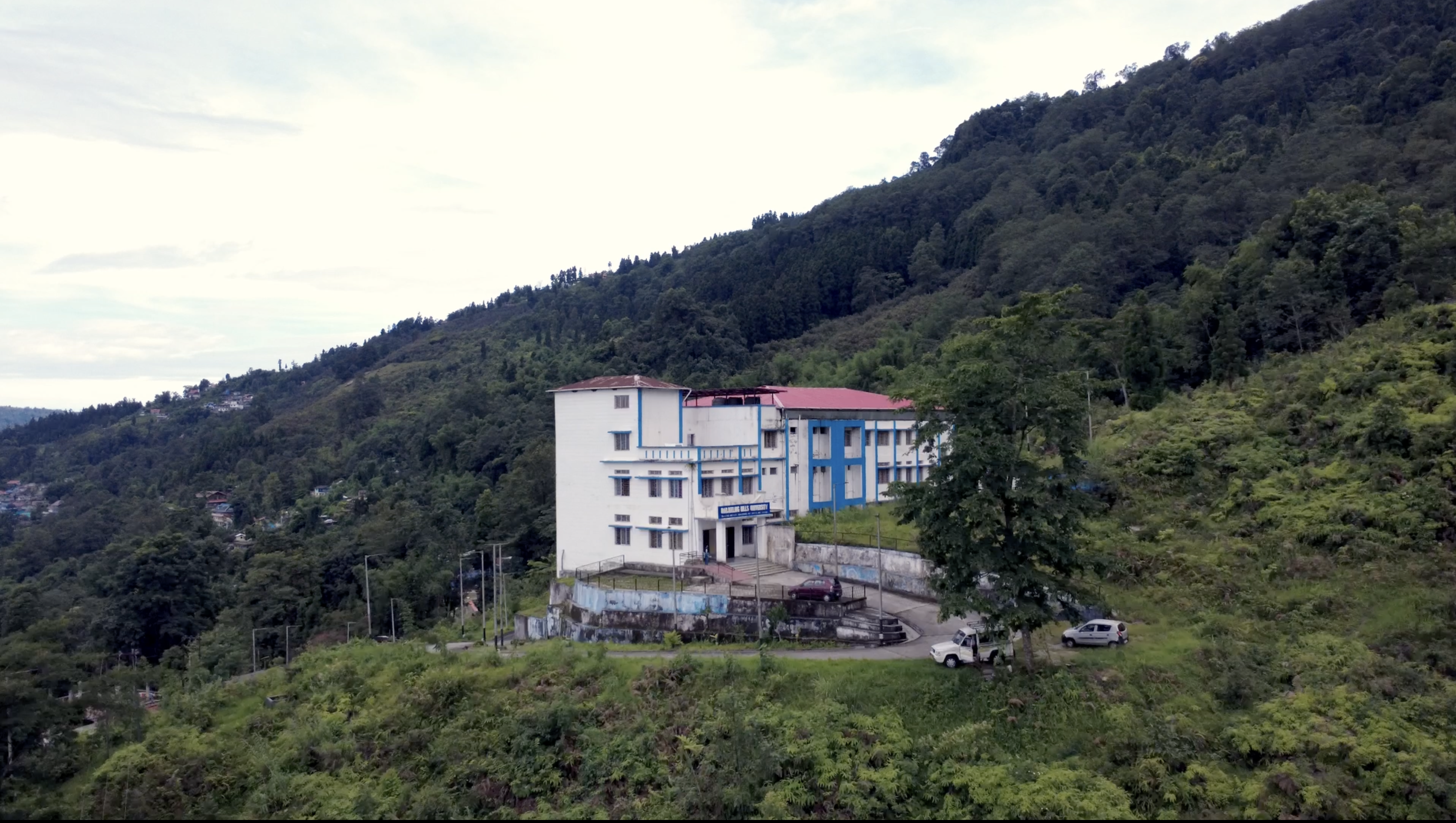
Darjeeling Hills University

Darjeeling Hills University (abbreviated as DHU) is a public state university in Darjeeling, West Bengal, India. The university was established through The Greenfield University Act, 2018, by the Government of West Bengal. This act was later amended by The Greenfield University (Amendment) Act, 2019 which replaced the name Greenfield University with Darjeeling Hills University. The university became active with the appointment of the first Vice Chancellor, Subires Bhattacharyya, in November 2021.

== History ==
=== Vice Chancellors ===
Subires Bhattacharyya, who was the Vice Chancellor of University of North Bengal, additionally served as the Vice Chancellor of Darjeeling Hills University. In September 2022, following the arrest of Subires Bhattacharyya, Om Prakash Mishra was appointed as the interim Vice Chancellor of the University of North Bengal, taking over the additional charge as Vice Chancellor of Darjeeling Hills University. In March 2023, Prem Poddar was appointed as the Vice Chancellor for a period of three months. After the expiry of his term, no interim or full-term Vice Chancellor was appointed till December 2024. In January 2025, Tejimala Gurung Nag joined as the first regular Vice Chancellor of Darjeeling Hills University.

=== Administration ===
The university started administrative operations from 2021, and until March 2024, the administrative officers of the University of North Bengal were assigned to administer Darjeeling Hills University. Since March 2024, faculty members from Darjeeling Government College have been assigned to handle the administrative affairs of the university.

== Campus ==
The main campus of the university is currently being built in Jogighat, Mungpoo, Darjeeling. Currently, the university is using the ITI Building in Bhasmey, Mungpoo as its campus. Due to the university commencing operations during the COVID-19 pandemic, classes were primarily held online. Some semesters were conducted at the University of North Bengal starting June 2023. In April 2024, fully on-campus classes officially commenced at the Darjeeling Hills University (ITI Building) in Mungpoo.

== Academics ==
The university offers postgraduate degree courses in English, History, Mass Communication, Mathematics, Nepali and Political Science.

== Recognition by University Grants Commission ==
The university is recognized as a degree-granting institution under Section 2(f) of the University Grants Commission Act, 1956. The date of notification for inclusion in the UGC List of Universities was September 13, 2022, and the date of inclusion in the list was September 30, 2022.
