= Rabindra Museum =

Tagore museum in Mungpoo, near Kalimpong, West Bengal, India

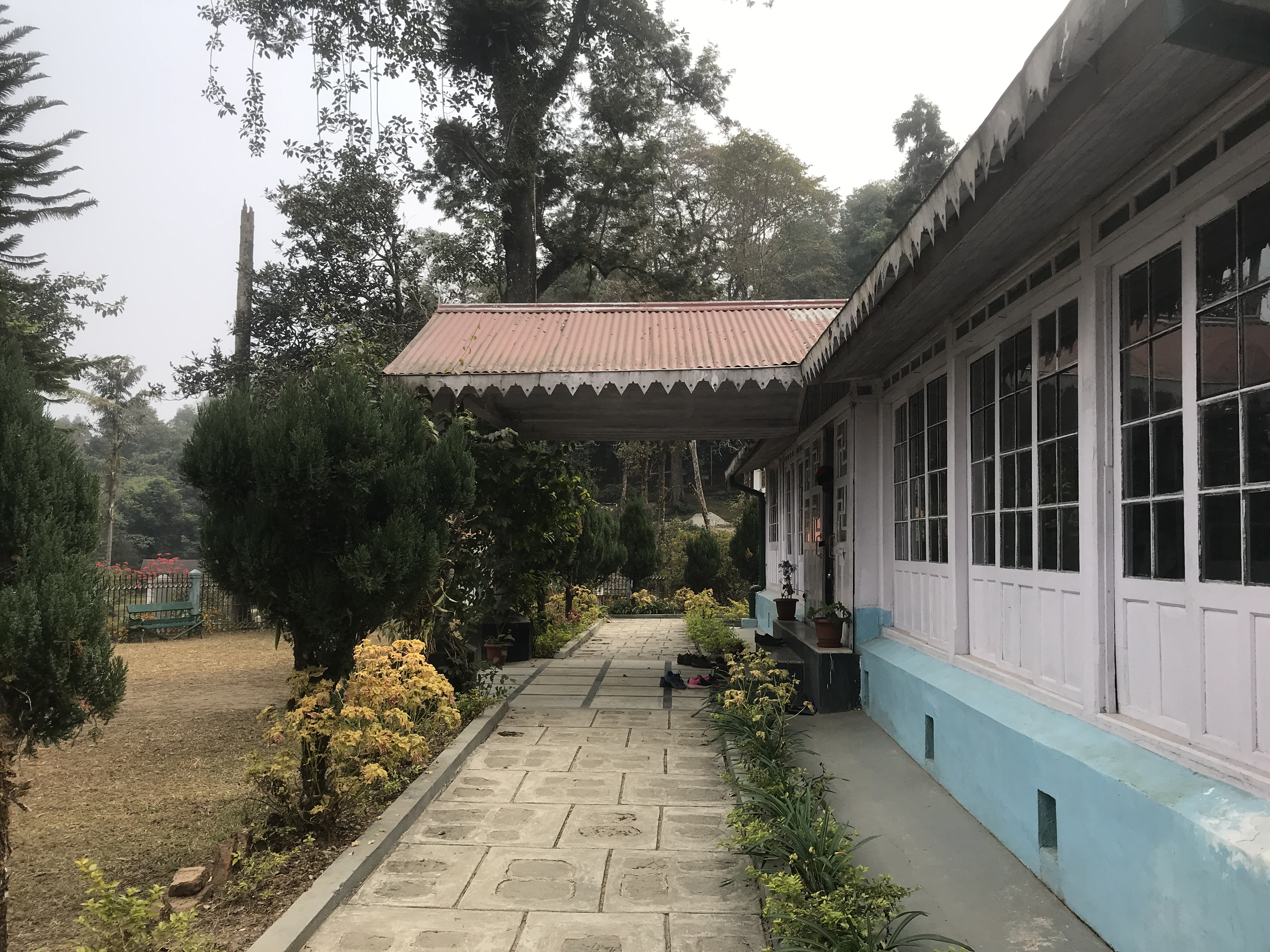

- Location within West Bengal Rabindra Museum (India)

General information
- Location: Mungpu, Darjeeling
- Address: Directorate of Cinchona & Other Medical Plants, Mungpu, Darjeeling- 734313
- Coordinates: 26.974425°N 88.375086°E

The Rabindra Museum is a museum located in Mungpoo, near Kalimpong, in the state of West Bengal, India. Poet Rabindranath Tagore stayed in this house in 1938 and 1939, at the invitation of poet and novelist Maitreyi Devi, the wife of quinologist dr. M.M.Sen.

On 13 April 2011, it was damaged when a tree fell during a storm.
