= DHU =

DHU may refer to:

- Donghua University, university in Shanghai, China
- Dihydrouridine, nucleoside
- Darjeeling Hills University, university in Darjeeling, India
- Defence Human Intelligence Unit, covert intelligence unit of the British Armed Forces
