= Poska =

Family name

Poska and Poška are Baltic surnames and may refer to:

- Antanas Poška (1903–1992), Lithuanian traveler and anthropologist
- Jaan Poska (1866–1920), Estonian lawyer, diplomat and politician
- Kristiina Poska (born 1978), Estonian conductor
- Vera Poska-Grünthal (1898–1986), Estonian lawyer and feminist
