= The Bengali Night =

- French theatrical release poster
- Directed by: Nicolas Klotz
- Written by: Jean-Claude Carrière; Mircea Eliade (novel)
- Based on: Bengal Nights by Mircea Eliade
- Starring: Soumitra Chatterjee; Shabana Azmi; Hugh Grant; Supriya Pathak
- Cinematography: Emmanuel Machuel
- Edited by: Jean-François Naudon
- Music by: Michel Portal, Brij Narayan
- Distributed by: Gaumont Distribution
- Release date: 1988
- Running time: 115 minutes
- Countries: France; Switzerland; United Kingdom
- Language: French

The Bengali Night (French: la Nuit Bengali) is a 1988 semi-autobiographical film based upon the Mircea Eliade 1933 Romanian novel, Bengal Nights, directed by Nicolas Klotz and starring Hugh Grant, Soumitra Chatterjee, Supriya Pathak and Shabana Azmi.

== Plot summary ==
Allan (Hugh Grant) is an engineer working in 1930s Calcutta. He is invited to stay with the family of his boss, Narendra Sen (Soumitra Chatterjee) which includes his wife, Indira (Shabana Azmi) and daughter Gayatri (Supriya Pathak). Gayatri and Allan become romantically involved leading to tragedy.

== Cast ==
- John Hurt as Lucien Metz
- Hugh Grant as Allan
- Soumitra Chatterjee as Narendra Sen
- Shabana Azmi as Indira Sen
- Supriya Pathak as Gayatri Sen

== Production and controversy ==
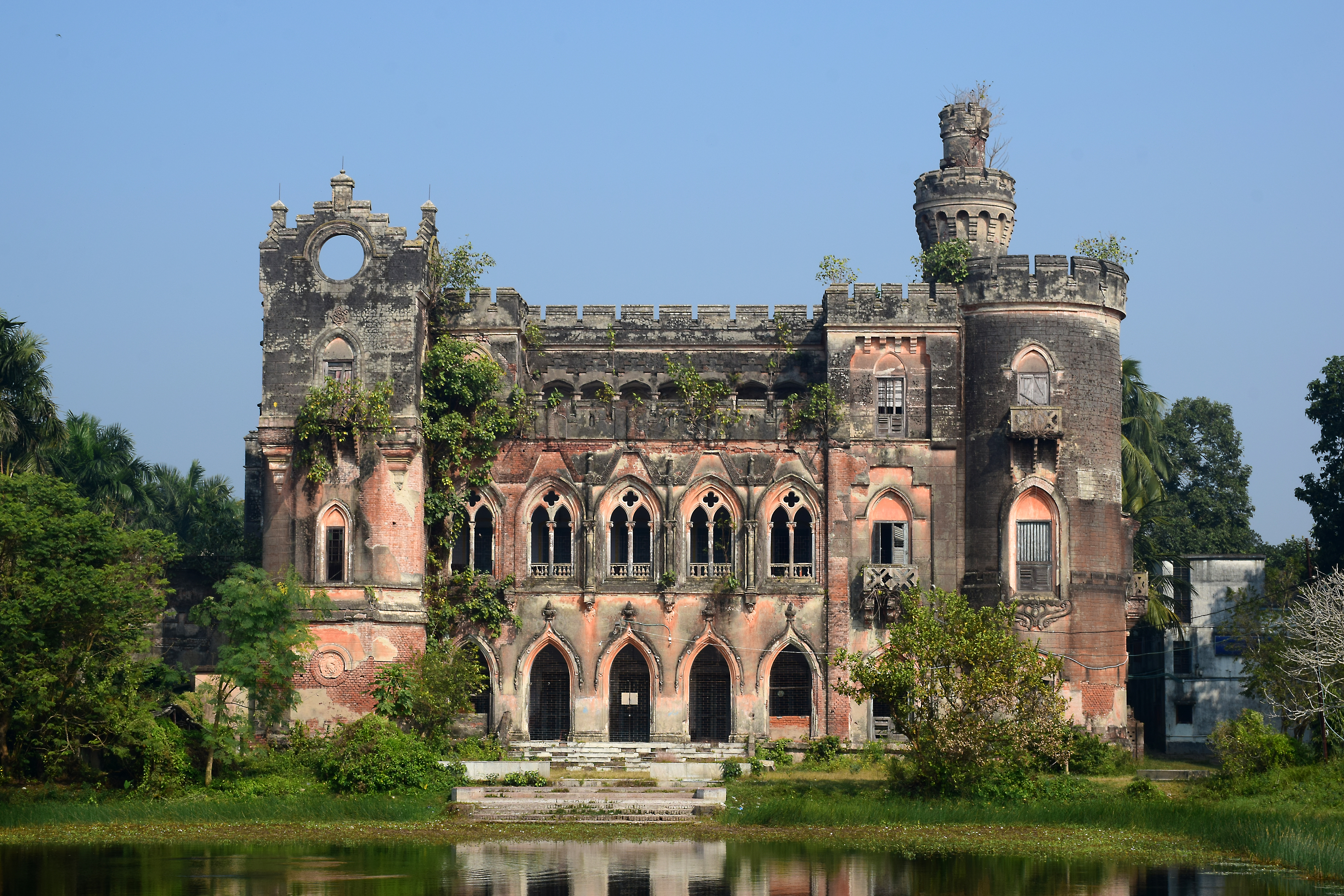
Gaine Bari (Gaine Castle) at Dhanyakuria, 50 km from Kolkata, where much of film was shot

Production of the film occurred about a decade after Maitreyi Devi, the inspiration for the character Gayatri, published her version of the story Na Hanyate (It Doesn't Die, 1974). She also extracted a promise from Eliade that his version would never be published in English as long as she is alive. According to Ginu Kamani in "A Terrible Hurt: The Untold Story behind the Publishing of Maitreyi Devi," Maitreyi witnessed the making of the film "The Bengali Night," which was shot in Calcutta from 1987 to 1988 (Eliade had died that year). Her protests culminated "in court cases against the film for insulting Hinduism and for being pornographic." Director Satyajit Ray visited the film sets and provided his film technicians from the production.

The film was mostly shot at the huge Zamindar Mansion - "Gaine Bari" (Gaine Castle) of the village of Dhanyakuria and some parts were filmed at Indrapuri Studios, Kolkata.

== Release and Reception ==
The film was only shown once in India at a film festival in 1989 to mixed reviews and was never released in theaters in the U.S. Kamani also notes:

Devi was bitter about the whole affair. She wrote in 1988: "Christinel [Eliade's widow] has hurt me very badly. She gave permission to a French Co. to film La Nuit Bengali. They came to Calcutta for shooting and gave huge publicity, pointing at me as the heroine." It was a close enough breach of Eliade's promise that his book would not come out in English during her lifetime. But it is not known whether Mrs. Eliade was following her husband's wishes or her own.

Bengal Nights by Mircea Eliade and It Does Not Die by Maitreyi Devi were released in 1994 by the University of Chicago Press as companion volumes depicting two sides of a romance.
