= Om Prakash Mishra =

Om Prakash Mishra may refer to:

- Om Prakash Mishra (judge)
- Om Prakash Mishra (politician)
- Om Prakash Mishra (academic)
