= Serio Oriento-Okcidento =

Series of books translated into Esperanto

Serio Oriento-Okcidento (English: East-West Series) is a publication series initiated by the Universal Esperanto Association, which aims to contribute to the "Program of UNESCO for the study and mutual appreciation of cultures." In the series, particularly important and representative works of world literature are translated into Esperanto. Various publishers have gradually contributed to the Serio, who have published books according to their ability and financial responsibility. The Steering Committee (Estraro) of the UEA approves the work for the Serio according to publisher's proposals, but the UEA has no financial responsibility.

== Technical requirements ==
- Magnitude: Normally all works of Serio have at least a hundred printed pages.
- Language: The language quality of the translation must be guaranteed.
- Introduction: Each volume must contain a brief explanation on the objectives of the Serio. This explanation may also appear as a longer preface by the President of the UEA or another person appointed for that purpose by the Committee.
- Technical details: The format, layout, font should resemble as closely as possible to those volumes already published in the Serio, size 21 x 15 cm, printed area 162 x 100 mm, of 9- or 10-point font.
- On the cover pages should appear the words "Serio Oriento Okcidento-n-ro # Sub Aŭspicio de UEA in Operaciaj Rilatoj kun Unesko." (Series East-West, No # Under the auspices of the UEA in consultative relations with UNESCO). The Director General of UEA indicate the serial number.
- Number to publish: The number to publish must be decided in agreement with the Managing Director of UEA.
- Part of the publication will be bound (or securely stapled).
- The publisher will send to the Central Office since the publication of UEA five bound copies for Hodler Library and for purposes of representation (including: UNESCO Library).

== Items of the Serio ==
| No | Title (eo) | Title (en) | Original title | Author | Original language | Translator(s) | Publishing location(s) | Publisher | Year | Pages | ISBN | Reissued |
|---|---|---|---|---|---|---|---|---|---|---|---|---|
| 1 | Malsata ŝtono | Hungry stone | ক্ষুধিত পাষাণ | Rabindranath Tagore N | Bengali | Sinha Laksmiswar | Malmö | Eldona Societo Esperanto | 1961 | 128 | | |
| 2 | Rakontoj de Oogai | Tales of Oogai | 鴎外作品集(4 works: 高瀬舟文, 山椒大夫, 文づかひ, 安部一族) | Ōgai Mori | Japanese | Mikami Teruo, Miyamoto Masao, Matuba Kikunobu, Nozima Yasutaro | Tokyo | Japana Esperanto-Instituto | 1962 | 117 | | reprint 1969 |
| 3 | La naŭzo | Nausea | La nausée | Jean-Paul Sartre | French | Roger Bernard | Rotterdam | Universala Esperanto-Asocio | 1963 | 222 | | |
| — | La Dia Komedio | Divine Comedy | La Divina Commedia | Dante Alighieri | Italian | Giovanni Peterlongo | Milan | S.I.E.I. | 1963 | 55 + 709 | | 2d release 1979 |
| 4 | Kalevala | Kalevala | Kalevala | Compiled par Elias Lönnrot | Finnish | Joh. Edv. Leppäkoski | Helsinki | Forumo Esperanto | 1964 | 392 | ISBN 951-9005-51-X | 2d release Helsinki E-Asocio de Finnlando 1985 |
| 5 | Martín Fierro | Martín Fierro | Martín Fierro | José Hernández | Spanish | Ernesto Sonnenfeld | La Laguna | J. Régulo | 1965 | 289 | | |
| 6 | La tragedio de Reĝo Lear | King Lear | King Lear | William Shakespeare | English | K. Kalocsay | Rotterdam | Universala Esperanto-Asocio | 1966 | 160 | ISBN 9290170131 | |
| 7 | Kvin virinoj de amoro | Five Women Who Loved Love | 好色五人女 | Saikaku Ihara | Japanese | Miyamoto Masao | Osaka | Pirato | 1966 | 159 | | 2d release Tokio Libroteko Tokio 1989 |
| 8 | La spleno de Parizo | The Spleen of Paris | Le Spleen de Paris | Charles Baudelaire | French | Paul Lobut | Copenhagen | KOKO | 1967 | 125 | | |
| 9 | El la vivo de Syunkin | Syunkin's Life | 春琴抄 | Jun'ichirō Tanizaki | Japanese | Miyamoto Masao et Isiguro Teruhiko | Osaka | Pirato | 1968 | 145 | | |
| 10 | La Nobla Korano | Qur'an | القرآن | | Arabic | Italo Chiussi | Copenhagen/Tehran | TK | 1969 | 20+667 | | 2d release 1970; photoreproduction of 2d release 1977 |
| 11 | Neĝa lando | Snow Country | 雪国 | Kawabata Yasunari N | Japanese | Konisi Gaku | Tokyo | Japana Esperanto-Instituto | 1971 | 119 | | 2d release 1992 |
| 12 | Je la flanko de la profeto | Beside the prophet | Je la flanko de la profeto | Italo Chiussi | Esperanto | | Antwerpen | TJ | 1978 | 362 | ISBN 9063360037 | |
| 13 | Brand | Brand | Brand | Henrik Ibsen | Norwegian | Erling Anker Haugen | Antwerpen / La Laguna | TK / Stafeto | 1978 | 320 | ISBN 9063360045 | |
| — | Aniaro | Aniara | Aniara : en revy om människan i tid och rum | Harry Martinson N | Swedish | William Auld et Bertil Nilsson | Malmö | Eldona Societo Esperanto | 1979 | 174 | | |
| 14 | La Luzidoj | The Lusiads | Os Lusíadas | Luís Vaz de Camões | Portuguese | Leopold H. Knoedt | Chapecó | Fonto | 1980 | 464 | | |
| 15 | Elektitaj fabloj | Chosen Fables | | Ivan A. Krylov | Russian | Sergej Rublov | Antwerpen / La Laguna | TK / Stafeto | 1979 | 336 | | |
| 16 | La sonetoj | Sonnets | Sonnets | William Shakespeare | English | William Auld | Pisa | Edistudio | 1981 | 326 | ISBN 887036013X | |
| 17 | Tutmonda sonoro | World-wide bell | Tutmonda sonoro | | different languages | K. Kalocsay | Budapest | Hungara Esperanto-Asocio | 1981 | 664 | ISBN 9635710771 | |
| 18 | Elpafu la sagon | Shoot the arrow | Elpafu la sagon | | different languages | Tibor Sekelj | Rotterdam | Universala Esperanto-Asocio | 1983 | 187 | ISBN 9290170255 | |
| 19 | La suferoj de la juna Werther | The Sorrows of Young Werther | Die Leiden des jungen Werthers | Johann Wolfgang von Goethe | German | Reinhard Haupenthal | Heckkendalheim | Berthold Faber | 1984 | 92 | ISBN 3923228996 | |
| 20 | Loulan; Fremdregionano | Lou-Lan; The Stranger | 楼蘭 異域の人 | Yasushi Inoue | Japanese | Miyamoto Masao | Tokyo | Japana Esperanto-Instituto | 1984 | 12 + 83 | | |
| 21 | Montara vilaĝo | The Mountain Village | The Mountain Village | Yeh Chun-Chan | English | William Auld | Beijing | Ĉina Esperanto-Eldonejo | 1984 | 264 | | |
| 22 | Sinjoro Tadeo | Sir Thaddeus | Pan Tadeusz | Adam Mickiewicz | Polish | Antoni Grabowski | Warsaw | Pola Esperanto-Asocio | 1986 | 334 | | |
| 23 | Sanga nupto kaj La domo de Bernarda Alba | Blood Wedding and The House of Bernarda Alba | Bodas de sangre; La casa de Bernarda Alba | Federico García Lorca | Spanish | Miguel Fernández | Madrid | La Misma | 1987 | 229 | ISBN 8486384036 | |
| 24 | Laŭdo de l' stulteco | The Praise of Folly | Μωρίας Εγκώμιον / Stultitiae Laus | Desiderius Erasmus | Latin | Gerrit Berveling | Rotterdam | Universala Esperanto-Asocio | 1988 | 112 | ISBN 9290170395 | |
| 25 | Aŭstralia antologio | Australian anthology | | editor: Alan Towsey | English | divers | Pisa | Edistudio | 1988 | 431 | ISBN 8870360369 | |
| 26 | La majstro kaj Margarita | The Master and Margarita | Ма́стер и Маргари́та | Mikhail Bulgakov | Russian | S.B. Pokrovskij | Sverdlovsk | Sezonoj | 1991 | 374 | | |
| 27 | Cent jaroj da soleco | One Hundred Years of Solitude | Cien años de soledad | Gabriel García Márquez N | Spanish | Fernando de Diego | Chapecó | Fonto | 1992 | 372 | | |
| 28 | Krimo kaj puno | Crime and Punishment | Преступление и наказание | Fyodor Dostoyevsky | Russian | Andrej Parfentjev | Yekaterinburg | Sezonoj | 1993 | 485 | | |
| 29 | Klera edzino | An educated wife | বিদুষী ভার্যা | Upendronath Gangopadhae | Bengali | Probal Dasgupta | Pisa | Edistudio | 1994 | 182 | ISBN 8870360474 | |
| 30 | Antologio Latina (Volumoj 1 kaj 2) | Latin anthology (vol. 1 and 2) | | compiled by Gerrit Berveling | Latin | Gerrit Berveling | Chapecó | Fonto | 1998 | 271 + 305 | | |
| 31 | La metamorfozo | The Metamorphosis | Die Verwandlung | Franz Kafka | German | Mauro Nervi | Pisa | Edistudio | 1996 | 75 | ISBN 8870360695 | |
| 32 | Malvivaj animoj | Dead Souls | Мёртвые души | Nikolai Gogol | Russian | Vladimir Vyĉegĵanin | Yekaterinburg | Sezonoj | 2001 | 223 | | |
| 33 | La lada tambureto | The Tin Drum | Die Blechtrommel | Günter Grass N | German | Tomasz Chmielik | Bielsko-Biała | Kleks | 2000 | 533 | ISBN 8371940793 | |
| 34 | La libro de la mirindaĵoj | The Travels of Marco Polo | Livres des merveilles du monde / Divisament dou monde | Marco Polo | different languages | Daniel Moirand | Rotterdam | Universala Esperanto-Asocio | 2001 | 445 | ISBN 92-9017-075-1 | |
| 35 | Ĉe akvorando | Water Margin | 水浒传 | Shi Naian / Luo Guanzhong? | Chinese | Laŭlum | Beijing | Ĉina Fremdlingva Eldonejo | 2004 | 1830 | ISBN 7119036378 | |
| 36 | La Dharmo-pado | Dhammapada | Dhamapada धम्मपद | | Pali | Gunnar Gällmo | Stockholm | Eldona Societo Esperanto | 2002 | 110 | ISBN 918528825X | |
| 37 | Sensorteco | Fateless | Sorstalanság | Imre Kertész N | Hungarian | István Ertl | Budapest | Aranygolyó | 2002 | 207 | ISBN 9632062175 | |
| 38 | Aventuroj de la brava soldato Ŝvejk dum la mondmilito | The Good Soldier Švejk | Osudy dobrého vojáka Švejka za světové války | Jaroslav Hašek | Czech | Vladimír Váňa | Dobřichovice | KAVA-PECH | 2004 | 71 | ISBN 8085853760 | |
| 39 | Leteroj de Paŭlo kaj lia Skolo | Pauline epistles and his School | Προς Ρωμαίους / Epistula ad Romanos | | Ancient Greek | Gerrit Berveling | Chapecó | Fonto | 2004 | 253 | | |
| 40 | Eŭgeno Onegin | Eugene Onegin | Евгений Онегин | Alexander Pushkin | Russian | Valentin Melnikov | Kaliningrad | Sezonoj | 2005 | 256 | | |
| 41 | La Gefianĉoj | The Betrothed | I promessi sposi | Alessandro Manzoni | Italian | Battista Cadei | Milan | Itala Esperanto-Federacio | 2006 | 495 | ISBN 8889177233 | |
| 42 | La Princo | The Prince | Il Principe | Niccolò Machiavelli | Italian | Carlo Minnaja | Milan | Itala Esperanto-Federacio | 2006 | 103 | ISBN 8889177683 | |
| — | Biblio | The Bible | τὰ βιβλία / תורה נביאים כתובים | | Hebrew | Ludwik Lejzer Zamenhof, Gerrit Berveling, John Cyprian Rust, B. John Beveridge, C.G. Wilkinson | Dobřichovice | KAVA-PECH | 2006 | 1375 | ISBN 8085853906 | |
| 43 | Fraŭlino Maitreyi | Bengal Nights | Maitreyi | Mircea Eliade | Romanian | Ionel Oneţ | Rotterdam | Bero | 2007 | 200 | | |
| 44 | Romano pri la Tri Regnoj | Romance of the Three Kingdoms | 三国演义 | Luo Guanzhong | Chinese | Laŭlum | Beijing | Ĉina Fremdlingva Eldonejo | 2008 | 1807 | ISBN 9787119054933 | |
| 45 | La edzino de kuracisto Hanaoka Seisyû | Physician Hanaoka Seisyû's wife | 華岡青洲の妻(lit. Hanaoka Seishū's wife) | Ariyoshi Sawako | Japanese | Konisi Gaku | Tokyo | Japana Esperanto-Instituto | 2008 | 157 | ISBN 9784888870566 | |
| 46 | Pilgrimo al la Okcidento | Journey to the West | 西遊記 | Wu Cheng'en | Chinese | Laŭlum | Beijing | Ĉina Fremdlingva Eldonejo | 2009 | 1976 | ISBN 9787119057668 | |
| 47 | R.U.R. | R.U.R. | R.U.R. | Karel Čapek | Czech | Moraviaj Esperanto-Pioniroj | Dobřichovice | KAVA-PECH | 2012 | 119 | ISBN 9788087169230 | |
| 48 | La Rakonto pri Kjều | The Tale of Kieu | Truyện Kiều | Nguyễn Du | Vietnamese | Le Cao Phan | Hanoi | Thế Giới | 2012 | 248 | ISBN 9786047704408 | |
| 49 | Pri maljunuloj, la ajxoj, kiuj pasas… | Old People and the Things that Pass | Van oude menschen, de dingen, die voorbij gaan… | Louis Couperus | Dutch | Gerrit Berveling | New York City | Mondial | 2013 | 256 | ISBN 9781595692627 | |
| 50 | Mi inventas la mondon | I devise the world | Obmyślam świat | Wisława Szymborska | Polish | Tomasz Chmielik, István Ertl, Danuta Kowalska, Lidia Ligęza, Kris Long, Adam Łomnicki, Martyna Taniguchi, Włodzimierz Wesołowski | Białystok, Đurđevac, Kraków, Świdnik | Podlahxia Libraro Łukasz Górnicki, Bjalistoka E-Societo | 2015 | 339 | ISBN 9788363470098 | |
| 51 | Poezia antologio | Poem Anthology | | Nazim Hikmet Ran | Turkish | Vasil Kadifeli | New York | Mondial | 2016 | 203 | ISBN 9781595693297 | |
| 53 | Memoraĵoj de kampara knabo | Memories of a Peasant Boy | Memorias dun neno labrego | Xosé Neira Vilas | Galician | Suso Moinhos | New York | Mondial | 2017 | 110 | ISBN 9781595693464 | |
