= Bengal Nights =

1933 Romanian novel by Mircea Eliade

- First edition
- Author: Mircea Eliade
- Original title: Maitreyi
- Language: Romanian
- Genre: Autobiographical Romance novel
- Publisher: Cultura naţională
- Publication date: 1933
- Publication place: Romania
- English publication date: 1993
- Media type: Print (Hardback & paperback)
- Pages: 175
- ISBN: 9789735004101

La Nuit Bengali (transl. Bengal Nights) is the French-language title of 1933 Romanian novel, Mayitreyi, written by the author and philosopher Mircea Eliade.

It is a fictionalized account of the relationship between Eliade, who was visiting India at the time, and the young Maitreyi Devi (protégée of the great Bengali poet Rabindranath Tagore), who became a famous writer herself. The novel was translated into Italian in 1945, German in 1948, Spanish in 1952, Bengali in 1988, Esperanto in 2007 (as Fraŭlino Maitreyi as part of the Serio Oriento-Okcidento), Catalan in 2011, Georgian in 2019, and Albanian in 2022. Its most famous translation is the one in French, published as La Nuit Bengali in 1950.

For many years, Maitreyi was not aware that the story had been published. After reading a translated version, she wrote her own version of the relationship in 1974. Entitled Na Hanyate, it was originally published in Bengali. It was published in English as It Does Not Die.

In fulfillment of a promise Eliade made to Maitreyi that his novel would not be published in English during their lifetimes, an English translation of Mayitreyi, Bengal Nights did not appear until 1993. In 1994, the University of Chicago Press published Mayitreyi and Na Hanyate in English as companion volumes.

== Plot ==
Allan is an employee of the company run by engineer Narendra Sen. When sent to work in a rain-abundant region of India, Allan becomes ill with malaria. He is returned to Calcutta and admitted into a hospital. After treatment, Sen invites Allan into his own house. Shortly after the young guest falls in love with the host's daughter (Maitreyi), their forbidden love gradually grows, resulting in Maitreyi and Allan ending up together.

Chabu, Maitreyi's sister, unwillingly witnesses the lovers hugging thus resulting in Narendra Sen banishing Allan and isolating Maitreyi. Both suffer immensely. To rid himself of the suffering, Allan retreats into a bungalow in the Himalaya mountains where he meets Jenia Issac.

== Film, TV or theatrical adaptations ==
La Nuit Bengali is a 1988 film based upon the French translation of the same name. It stars Hugh Grant (Allan), Soumitra Chatterjee (Narendra Sen), Shabana Azmi (Indira Sen), Supriya Pathak (Gayatri), and Anne Brochet (Guertie).

In 2025, Șerban Nichifor composed the ballet suite Maitreyi, which was published in France.
