= Antanas Poška =

Lithuanian traveler and anthropologist (1903–1992)

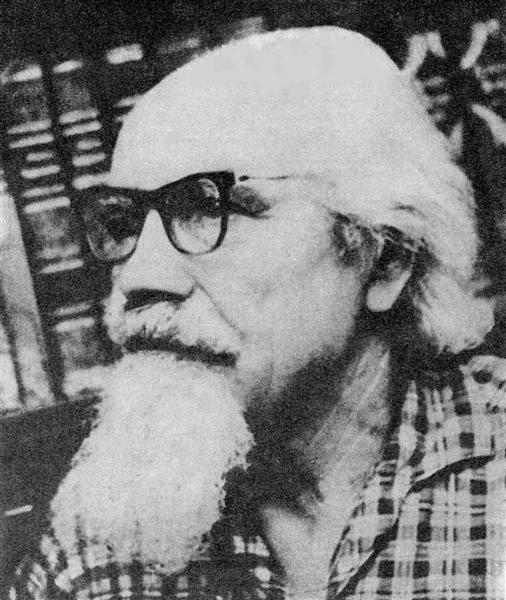
- Antanas Poška in 1967
- Born: 24 March 1903; Pasvalys, Russian Empire
- Died: 16 October 1992 (aged 89); Vilnius, Lithuania
- Resting place: Antakalnis Cemetery
- Other name: Antanas Paškevičius
- Occupations: Anthropologist, journalist
- Known for: Motorbike journey to India (1929–1936); Member of the Esperanto movement in Lithuania
- Notable work: From the Baltic Sea to the Bay of Bengal

Antanas Poška (24 March [O.S. 10 March] 1903 – 16 October 1992) was a Lithuanian traveler and anthropologist, as well as a member of the Esperanto movement in Lithuania. He is best known for his journey to India in 1929–1936.

In India, he studied Sanskrit and received bachelor's degree in anthropology from the University of Bombay and wrote his PhD thesis at the University of Calcutta on the Shina-speaking people but was unable to defend it. He interacted with India's intellectual elite and participated in anthropological expeditions. He met with Rabindranath Tagore and translated some of his works into Lithuanian. Poška returned to Lithuania in 1936 and worked as a journalist.

He was recognized as the Righteous Among the Nations for hiding three Lithuanian Jews during the Holocaust in Lithuania. After the Soviet takeover in 1945, he refused to destroy books deemed unacceptable to the Soviet regime and was imprisoned in a Gulag. Unable to return to Lithuania, Poška later worked at several museums in Central Asia. He was allowed to return to Lithuania in 1959 and worked as a lecturer and journalist and continued his anthropological studies, but his past as a political prisoner prevented him from taking a more prominent position. By age 60, he had visited 75 countries and 120 nations.

Poška was a prolific writer contributing articles to Lithuanian and foreign press. His bibliography, published in 2006, has 3,756 entries, but his main work, the eight-volume Nuo Baltijos iki Bengalijos (From the Baltic Sea to the Bay of Bengal) on his experiences in India, was published only in 2002–2012, a decade after his death.

== Biography ==
=== Early life ===
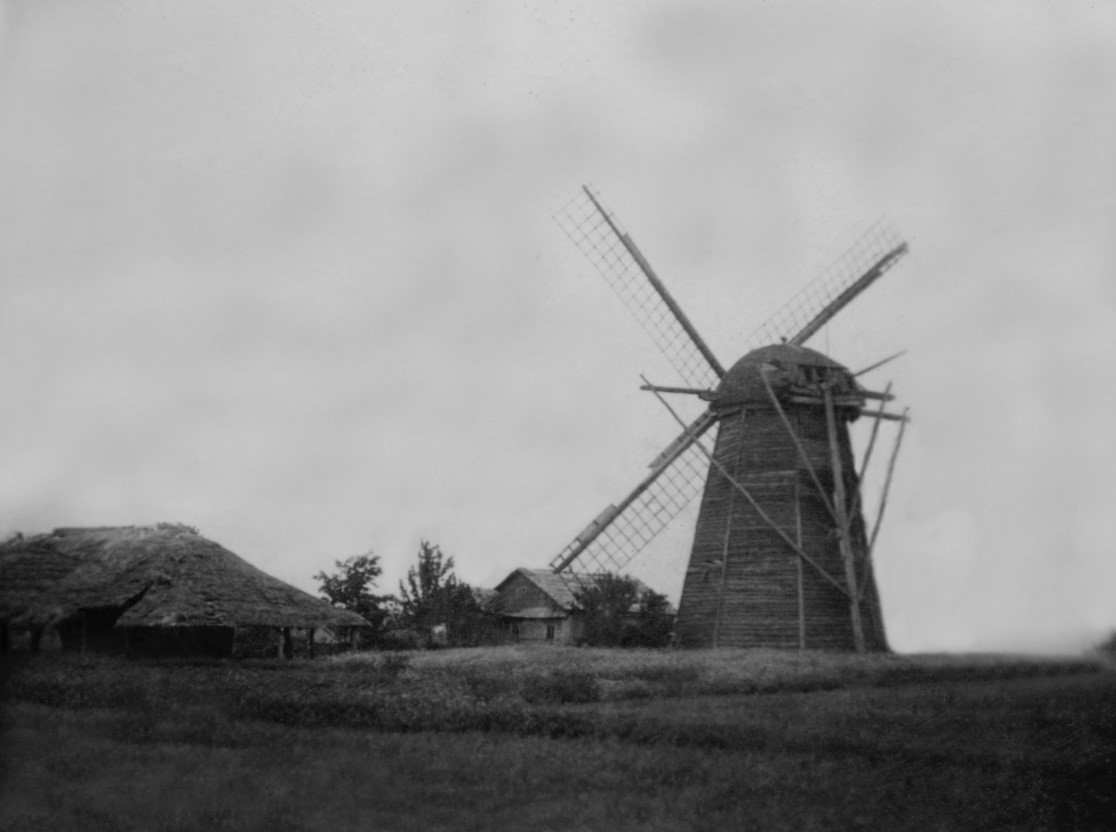
Gripkeliai village, around 1940

Poška was born on 24 March [O.S. 10 March] 1903 in the family of farmers in northern Lithuania, in the village of Gripkeliai of Pasvalys district. His interest in Esperanto emerged as early as 1913, when he received his first Esperanto textbook as a gift. He learned the language independently and in 1917, during World War I, a German soldier noticed him reading an Esperanto book. The soldier shared addresses of Esperantists and Poška began corresponding with many intellectuals. These connections proved vital in his later travels. Poška became a member of an Esperantist group in Saločiai. Still a schoolboy, Poška began submitting articles to the Lithuanian press. His parents disapproved the various activities and he moved out to Kaunas in 1921.

In Kaunas, Poška lived in a dormitory maintained by Žiburėlis society and worked odd jobs, including construction, while attending an evening school. In 1922, he visited Veisiejai and collected memories of local residents about L. L. Zamenhof, inventor of the Esperanto. In 1923, he attended the World Esperanto Congress in Nuremberg, Germany, and a year later received an Esperanto teacher certificate from the Lithuanian Ministry of Education. In 1926, when the first Lithuanian radio station opened in Kaunas, Poška hosted a regular Esperanto-language program Nia anguleto.

From 1926 to 1929, Poška studied medicine at Kaunas University. Poška started traveling in Lithuania and abroad rather early. In July 1925, he completed his first bike tour across Lithuania with three friends. Three years later, he procured a motorbike and set off on a trip around the Baltic Sea visiting 12 countries. With its completion an ambitious idea to reach India was conceived.

=== Journey to India ===
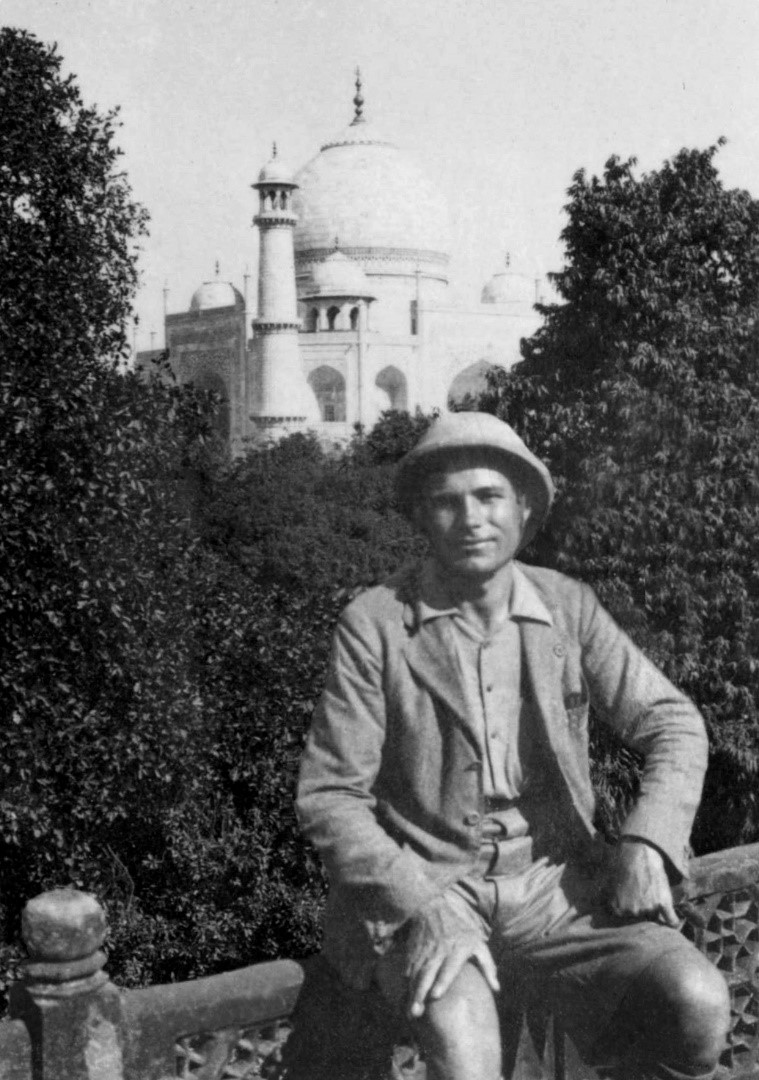
Poška at the Taj Mahal in 1931–1932

Intrigued by linguistic similarities between the Lithuanian and Sanskrit languages, Poška decided to travel to India to study Sanskrit, research Indian culture, and explore Lithuania's cultural links with India. He chose to travel on a motorbike, which he obtained from the Belgian manufacturer FN for free in exchange for publicity. While preparing for the journey, he got acquainted with another dedicated traveler Matas Šalčius, a journalist by profession, who was much older and already an experienced traveler. The duo started their motorbike trip on 20 November 1929 from Kaunas.

The travelers first reached Constantinople then Cairo and continued via the Middle East. They took very little money, 69 U.S. dollars combined, and had to find ways of making money along the way. They financed the trip by giving lectures on Esperanto, Lithuania, and other topics as well as submitting articles and photos to Lithuanian and foreign press. However, the relationship between Šalčius and Poška deteriorated as they faced financial troubles and mechanical problems. While in Tehran, Poška became severely ill. Šalčius abandoned Poška and later did not mention him in his memoirs. Poška received help from local Esperantists and spent about half a year recovering. He then boarded a ship in Bushire and arrived in Bombay on 23 March 1931.

=== In India ===
With the help of local Esperantists and intellectuals, including Jivanji Jamshedji Modi and N. A. Thooti, he enrolled at the University of Bombay. In 1931, he visited the University of Varanasi for 42 days to study Sanskrit and begin his translations of Bhagavad Gita and Rigveda into Lithuanian (manuscript of Bhagavad Gita was lost; translation of Rigveda is kept at the Martynas Mažvydas National Library of Lithuania). In 1933, Poška completed bachelor's degree in anthropology with thesis on the Aryans, their origin and migration. After graduation, Poška moved to Calcutta and enrolled in the University of Calcutta. While visiting Mohenjo-daro, he met professor Biraja Sankar Guha who invited him to work at the Anthropological Laboratory of the Indian Museum.

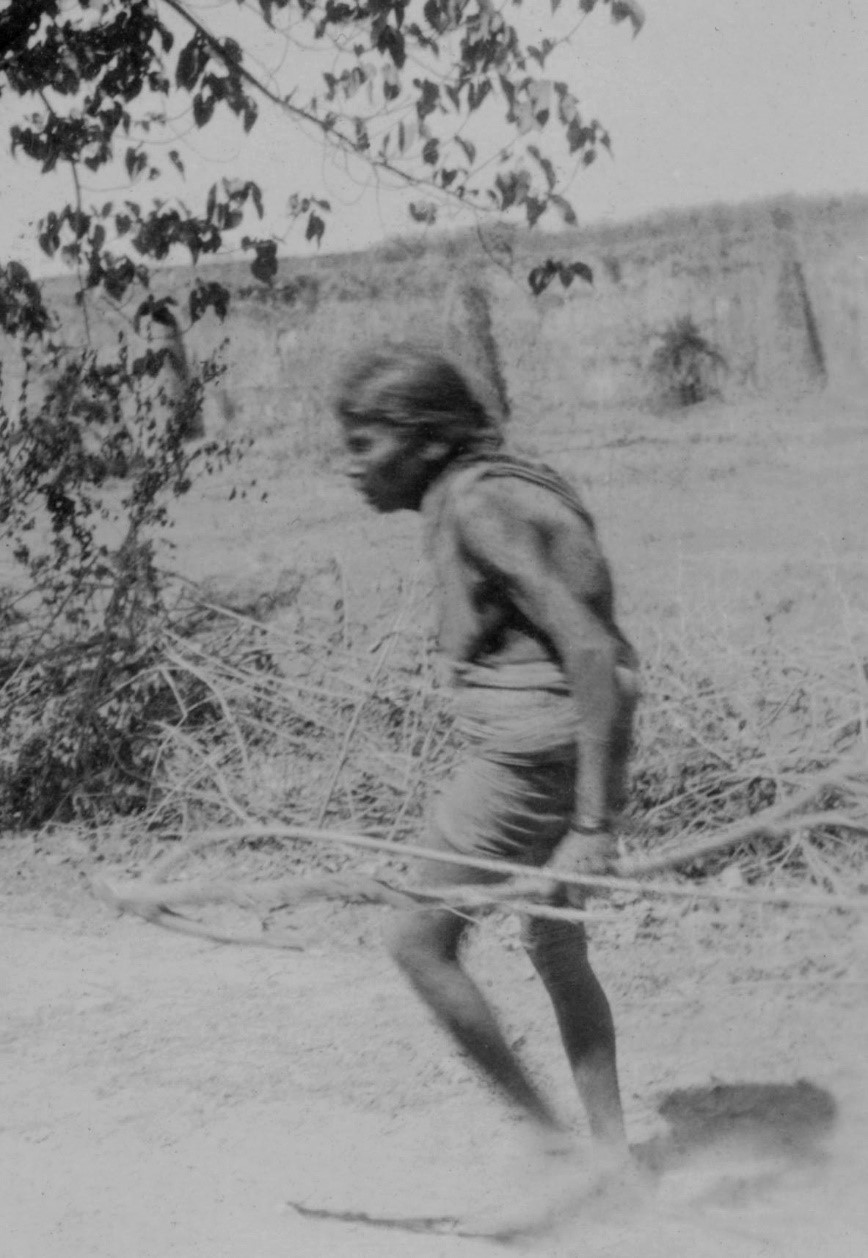
A tribal woman from the Andaman Islands, picture taken by Poška in 1935

The Lithuanian press widely reports that in 1933, Poška accompanied Oxford University professor Aurel Stein on an anthropological expedition to the Taklamakan Desert in Central Asia. However, in 1932–1936, Stein explored Persia. In 1933–1936, Poška participated in anthropological expeditions in Southeast Asia and the Himalayas, where he collected data about Shina-language speaking peoples of northwestern Himalayas. In 1935, Poška with a team of young scholars from the Indian Museum went on a three-month expedition to the Andaman and Nicobar Islands led by the Australian scholar Dr. M. E. Smith. They traveled to various parts of the archipelago and studied the local aboriginal tribes. Poška and his team gathered somatometric measurements and other anthropological data on the lifestyle, habits, and customs of the local inhabitants.

While in Bengal, Poška interacted with Calcutta's intellectual elite, university professors, and young researchers: Biraja Sankar Guha, Himangshu Kumar Bose, Achyuta Kumar Mitra, Bajra Kumar Chatterji, and others. He also befriended Suniti Kumar Chatterji who later embarked on a comparative study The Balts and the Aryans, exploring the commonalities between India's Vedic and the Baltic pagan rites. Published as a monograph by the Indian Institute of Advanced Study in 1968, this Chatterji's book is dedicated to, among others, Antanas Poška. Friendship with the renowned Indian Esperantist Sinha Laksmiswar led Poška to Shantiniketan where he had a chance to interact with Rabindranath Tagore. Under Tagore's personal supervision, Poška translated some of Tagore's poems into Lithuanian; some of these manuscripts reemerged in 2013 when a woman gave them to Poška's daughter after years of safekeeping from Soviet censors. Poška met Mahatma Gandhi twice (in Bombay and Allahabad) and conveyed the support of the Lithuanian people to India's independence struggle; Gandhi presented Poška with a decorative hand-made cloth that he preserved despite various hardships.

In 1936, Poška submitted his PhD thesis in physical anthropology under professor Biraja Sankar Guha, titled Physical Affinities of Shina-speaking People of the Western Himalayas. However, he did not have a chance to defend it and the dissertation was lost. He was awarded posthumously an honorary degree in 2014.

=== Return to Lithuania ===
Poška left India in 1936. On his way back to Lithuania, he covered Afghanistan, Iran, and Turkish Kurdistan. In Turkey, he wrote an article on the Kurds and their aspirations for which he was arrested and escorted 318 km (198 mi) in chains to Bulgaria in June 1936. He was released, but most of his possessions and research materials, including the translation of Bhagavad Gita, were confiscated and never recovered. He spent some time in Bulgaria, where he collected accounts of the locals on Jonas Basanavičius, one of the founding fathers of independent Lithuania, who had lived in Bulgaria at the end of the 19th century.

Poška returned to Lithuania just before Christmas 1936. In 1937–1940, Poška worked as a journalist with the newspapers and magazines Akademikas, Lietuvos aidas, Trimitas, and was editor-in-chief of the newspaper Darbas. In 1937–1940, he served as the chairman of the Lithuanian Union of Esperantists. After his return to Lithuania, Poška started writing his account of the Indian journey. Two volumes of his book From the Baltic Sea to the Bay of Bengal were published just before the Soviet invasion of Lithuania in June 1940; the third volume, in the works at a press, was destroyed.

=== Soviet persecution ===
During the Nazi occupation (1941–1944) Poška started working as a manager of Vilnius Public Library No. 3. Despite the dangers, Poška saved at least three Lithuanian Jews by hiding them from the SS in his house. Poška was awarded the Life Saving Cross by the President of Lithuania in 1998 and was recognized as the Righteous Among the Nations by the Government of Israel in 2000. Despite Nazi orders to destroy Jewish books he concealed and preserved over 1,000 publications which were later transferred to the Jewish Museum.

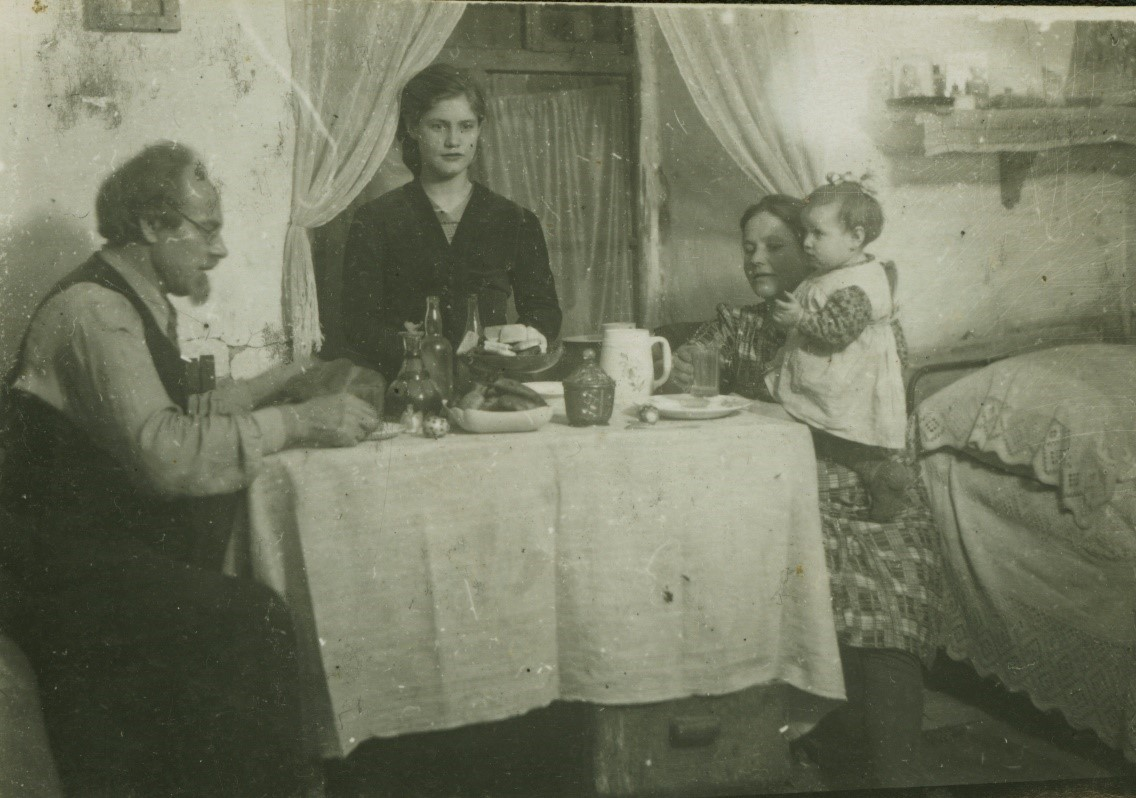
Easter table in Osh, Kyrgyzstan, mid-1950s

After the Soviets returned to Lithuania in mid-1944, Poška was appointed as the head of the Library Department of Soviet Lithuania's Education Commissariat. For refusing the orders from Juozas Žiugžda to destroy books published before the Soviet occupation, Poška was arrested in June 1945 and sentenced to imprisonment in a forced labor camp in Siberia. He was first sent to a prison near Velsk, Arkhangelsk Oblast, and later to a forced labor camp in the Komi Republic.

In 1948, his forced-labor sentence was replaced with a forced relocation to Central Asia without the right to ever return to Lithuania. His academic nature won him positions at several ethnographic museums of Central Asia in 1949–1959, but due to his status of a political prisoner he could not assume leading posts and had trouble publishing his works. He worked at a museum of Petropavl in Kazakhstan (1949–1953), the Museum of Osh in Kyrgyzstan (1953–1957), Andijan Museum in Uzbekistan, and the State Museum of Dushanbe in Tajikistan (1958–1959). He also took part in various archaeological expeditions in Central Asia. While in Osh, Poška studied caves, particularly the Rusha-Unkur Cave or the Eagle Cave, of the Sulayman Mountain and their petroglyphs. During archaeological excavations in the cave, Poška found an inventory of microliths dated to the Neolithic.

=== Return from Gulag ===
After Stalin's death in 1953, many cases of the Soviet political prisoners were re-examined by the Soviet authorities during the de-Stalinization campaign and Poška was allowed to return to Lithuania in 1959. After his return home Poška worked as a lecturer, a correspondent of several newspapers, and the chairman of the reestablished Vilnius Esperantist Club in 1964–1969. As a former political prisoner, he remained suspect to Soviet authorities and was not allowed to continue academic activities or publish his books until the Perestroika reforms in 1985.

Poška continued to travel. For example, in 1960, together with biologist Tadas Ivanauskas, he visited the Tigrovaya Balka Nature Reserve in Tajikistan and later hitchhiked to Leningrad and Moldova. In summer 1972, at age 70, he went on the last large journey. It was a five-week motorbike ride to the Mount Elbrus in the Caucasus Mountains, via the Georgian Military Road to Georgia, Armenia, Azerbaijan and Sukhumi on the Black sea.

The last decade of his life Poška spent under the piles of his rescued archive, trying and failing to publish it. His major work, the eight-volume book on his journey to India From the Baltic Sea to the Bay of Bengal, was published by his supporters already after his death.

== Honorary doctorate by the University of Calcutta ==
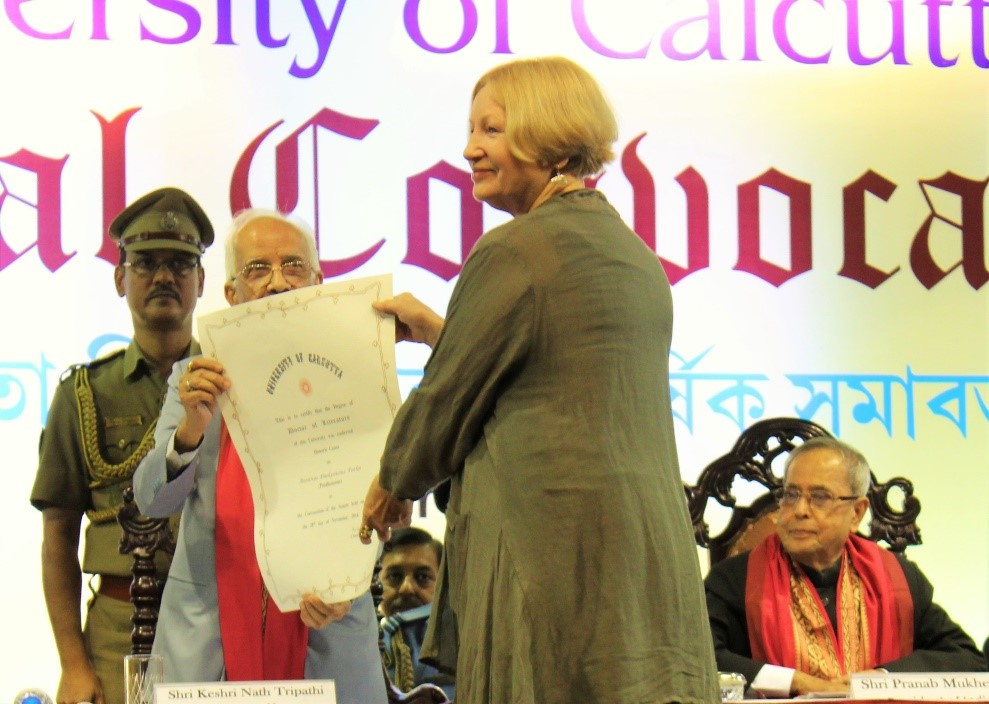
Poška's daughter Laimutė Kisielienė receives the regalia of Honoris Causa D.Litt., awarded to her father posthumously by the University of Calcutta

Before leaving Calcutta in 1936, Poška prepared and submitted his PhD thesis in physical anthropology under professor Biraja Sankar Guha, titled Physical Affinities of Shina-speaking People of the Western Himalayas. According to Poška's diary, his thesis was sent to the British Museum in London in 1936, and he himself was planning to travel to London to defend his thesis there. However, financial troubles delayed in his departure and the outbreak of World War II prevented him from completing this task.

After his visit to Lithuania in 1966, Suniti Kumar Chatterji agreed to help Poška recover his PhD dissertation from London and secure his degree. Later, Poška wrote in his diary that he received a letter from Chatterji informing that the University of Calcutta has granted Poška the PhD. However, this could not be confirmed by the archives of University of Calcutta.

In 2014, the Lithuanian Embassy in New Delhi approached the University of Calcutta with a proposal to posthumously award Poška with a doctoral degree. On 28 November 2014, Poška was conferred honorary D.Litt. by Keshari Nath Tripathi, Governor of West Bengal and Chancellor of the University of Calcutta ex officio. Pranab Mukherjee, President of India, was also present at the occasion. The regalia were received by Laimutė Poškaitė, Poška's daughter. To commemorate Poška's connection with the University of Calcutta, a memorial board was unveiled at the university's library on 16 January 2015.

== Legacy ==
Poška's journey and research continue to hold cultural significance in both Lithuania and India. In 2019, to commemorate the 90th anniversary of his 1929 departure, a duo of Lithuanian travelers, Rimas Bružas and Aurimas Mockus, traced Poška's original route to Calcutta on a side-car motorcycle, an expedition documented for Lithuanian National Television.

== Publications ==
The grave of Antanas Poška at the Antakalnis cemetery

Poška's bibliography, published in 2006, numbers 3,756 entries. Most of these are articles published in the press of Lithuania and other countries (India, Soviet Union, Poland, UK) as well as in international Esperanto magazines. He wrote at least 30 articles in the Indian press between 1932 and 1935. Over 100 articles on India were published in the Lithuanian press. Poška's articles on his archaeological research in Kazakhstan and Kyrgyzstan were published in several newspapers and magazines of Central Asia and the archaeological journals in the Soviet Union, sometimes using an assumed name.

Poška wrote numerous books, but only a handful was published:

- Esperanto raktas (A Key to Esperanto), 1929 (Kaunas), republished in 1969 (Vilnius) and 2003 (Vilnius) – translation of a 1925 booklet published in Geneva
- Nuo Baltijos iki Bengalijos (From the Baltic Sea to the Bay of Bengal), first two volumes in 1939 (Kaunas), complete set of 8 volumes published in 2002–2012 (Klaipėda)
- Indoeuropiečių istorijos pėdsakais (Tracing the Footsteps of the Indo-European History), 1988 (Vilnius)
- Requiem, poetic miniatures, 1989 and 2004 (Vilnius) and 2005 (Kaunas) – written while in prison on pieces of birch bark
- Mano gyvenimo pasaka (The Tale of My Life), 2003 (Vilnius)
