= Maitreyi Devi =

Indian poet and novelist

- Born: 10 September 1914; Chittagong, Bangladesh (Formerly British India)
- Died: 29 January 1989 (aged 74); Kolkata, West Bengal, India
- Occupations: Poet, novelist
- Known for: Na Hanyate
- Spouse: Manmohan Sen
- Children: 2
- Parents: Surendranath Dasgupta (father); Himani Madhuri Rai (mother)

Maitreyi Devi (or Maitreyī Devī; 10 September 1914 – 4 February 1990) was an Indian poet and novelist. She is best known for her Sahitya Akademi Award-winning novel, Na Hanyate (transl. 'It Does Not Die').

== Biography ==
Devi was born in 1914. She was the daughter of philosopher Surendranath Dasgupta and protégée of poet Rabindranath Tagore. She studied in St. John's Diocesan Girls' Higher Secondary School, Calcutta (now Kolkata) and graduated from the Jogamaya Devi College, an affiliated undergraduate women's college of the historic University of Calcutta, in Kolkata. She published her first book of poetry in 1930, at age 16, with a preface by Tagore.

By this time she was already attending university, the Romanian intellectual Mircea Eliade was invited by her father to stay at their house. After several months, when her parents discovered the 23-year-old Eliade and Devi had an intimate relationship, they asked Eliade to leave and never contact her again.

She married Dr. Manmohan Sen when she was 20 and he was 34. They had two children together.

In 1938 and 1939, she invited Rabindranath Tagore to stay in her and her husband's house in Mungpoo near Kalimpong, which later became the Rabindra Museum. Her works include Mongpute Rabindranath (Tagore by The Fire Side), a record of his visit with her.

She was the founder of the Council for the Promotion of Communal Harmony in 1964, and vice-president of the All-India Women's Coordinating Council. She also established orphanages.

In 1972, she learned Mircea Eliade had written the novel Bengal Nights, that purported to describe a sexual relationship between them. According to Richard Eder, writing for the Los Angeles Times, "he turned what evidently were fervent but limited caresses into a lavishly sexual affair, with Maitreyi paying nightly bedroom visits as a kind of mystically inflamed Hindu goddess of love." In late 1972, she published a collection of poems, Aditya Marichi (Sun Rays), which references Eliade, and according to Ginu Kamani, writing for the Toronto Review, "reflect the turbulence she felt at dealing, at the age of fifty eight, forty-two years after the fact of their involvement, with the old passions of her youth."

After traveling to the University of Chicago to give lectures on Tagore, where Eliade was a professor, and meeting with him several times, she released her novel Na Hanyate (It Does Not Die: A Romance) in 1974, which won the Sahitya Akademi Award in 1976. Nina Mehta, in a review for the Chicago Tribune, writes, "Devi rubbishes the sex scenes and a few particulars in Eliade's novel, claiming that Alain's confessional tone elides the truth, that his memory implies false facts. Yet ironically, and perhaps waggishly, she answers Eliade's fiction by giving a larger credence to the fantasy he created."

It Does Not Die and Bengal Nights were republished in 1994 as companion volumes by the University of Chicago Press, although Kamani writes, "Astonishing as it might sound given the sleight-of-hand dictated by marketing decisions at the University of Chicago Press, Devi's "response" was written to stand on its own." The book has been translated into various European languages, including Romanian. In the 1980s, an adaptation of Bengal Nights was developed into a film, starring Hugh Grant and Supriya Pathak, and Devi challenged the film, first by insisting that the name of the character Maitreyi be changed to Gayatri, and later in lawsuits that delayed production. By 1996, the film had not been released in India nor the United States.

== Awards ==
She received Sahitya Akademi Award in the year 1976 for her novel Na Hanyate.

== Publications ==
- Tagore by Fireside, 1943
- Rabindranath—The Man behind His Poetry, 1973
- It Does Not Die: A Romance, 1974
- রবীন্দ্রনাথ গৃহে ও বিশ্বে (Rabindranath at home and in the world)
- মংপুতে রবীন্দ্রনাথ (Rabindranath at Mangpu)

== See also ==
- List of Sahitya Akademi Award winners for Bengali
