= Memoirs of a Peasant Boy =

1961 novel by Xosé Neira Vilas

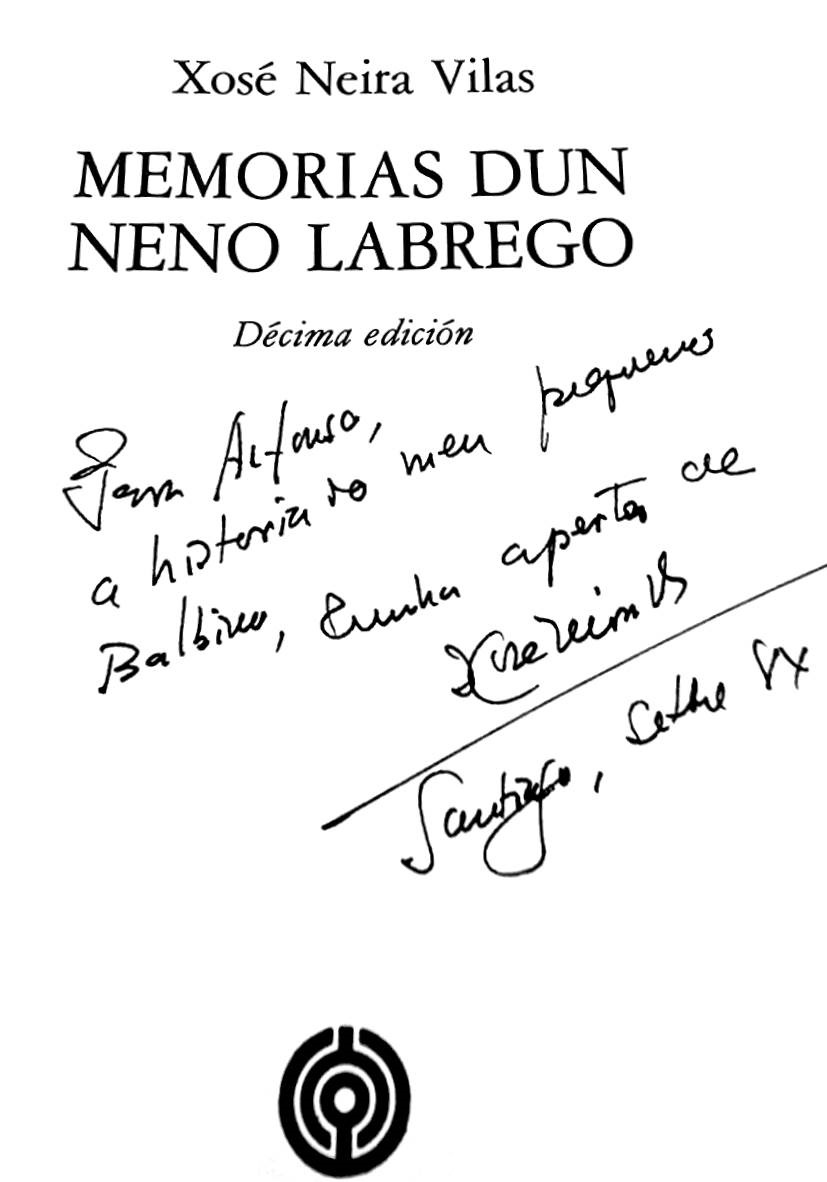
- Author: Xosé Neira Vilas
- Original title: Memorias dun neno labrego
- Translator: Camilo Ogando
- Illustrator: Isaac Díaz Pardo
- Cover artist: Luís Seoane (first edition); Isaac Díaz Pardo
- Language: Galician language
- Genre: Novel
- Publisher: Editorial Follas Novas; Ediciós do Castro
- Publication date: 1961
- Publication place: Galicia
- English publication date: 2007
- Media type: Print

Memoirs of a Peasant Boy (Galician: Memorias dun neno labrego) is a social and historical novel by Galician writer Xosé Neira Vilas published in Argentina on January 5, 1961. It is a book on the Galician field seen by the eyes of a child, and is the most read work of Galician-language literature, with more than 600,000 copies sold by 2015. It is dedicated to all boys and all girls who speak Galician.
