= Na Hanyate =

1974 novel by Maitreyi Devi

First edition

Na Hanyate (transl. It Doesn't Die) is a novel written in 1974 in Bengali by Maitreyi Devi, an Indian poet and novelist who was the protégée of the great Bengali poet Rabindranath Tagore. The writer received Sahitya Akademi Award for this novel in 1976. She wrote the novel in response to Romanian philosopher Mircea Eliade's book La Nuit Bengali (titled Bengal Nights in English), which related a fictionalised account of their romance during Eliade's visit to India.

== Background and publication ==
Mircea Eliade came to study under Maitreyi Devi's father in Kolkata in 1930. She was 16 then, and Eliade 23. Her father was very proud of his daughter's intelligence and provided her with a liberal education unthinkable during that time in India. He even encouraged Mircea and Maitreyi to study together. Devi later wrote, "We were two good exhibits in his museum". During this time Mircea and Maitreyi became close to each other. On discovering their secret romance her father ordered Mircea to leave their house.

Based on their relationship, Mircea's novel in Romanian, Maitreyi, was published in 1933. Shortly after it was translated into French and published with the title La Nuit Bengali, it became a huge success. Maitreyi Devi's father found out about the book during his 1938-39 Europe tour and passed the information to his daughter upon returning home. In 1953, during her own Europe tour, Devi came across several Romanians who told her that they recognized her name from Mircea's novel. These encounters further piqued Devi's interest in reading the novel, though she was still unaware of the novel's full content. In 1972, Sergiu Al-George, a close friend of Mircea, came to Kolkata and told Maitreyi about the details of the book, informing her that the book described a sexual relationship between her and Mircea. Devi asked a friend to translate the novel from French and was shocked to find how it depicted their relationship. Through Na Hanyate, Maitreyi Devi responded to Mircea's novel and countered his fantasies.

In 1973, Maitreyi Devi was invited by Chicago University to give lectures on Rabindranath Tagore. There, she made an unannounced visit to Eliade, by then a professor at the same university. During the next two months of her stay, they met several times, which was condensed to a single one at the end of her book. She confronted him about the claims he wrote in his book and, as a result, Mircea promised the book would not be published in English in her lifetime. Five years after her death in 1989, the University of Chicago Press published it in English titled Bengal Nights.

Though the two books - "Maitreyi" (Romanian original edition: 1933) and "Na hanyate" (Bengali original edition: 1974) - relate a common event, they differ in many aspects of their plots and perspectives. Taken together, the New York Times describes the two novels as "an unusually touching story of young love unable to prevail against an opposition whose strength was tragically buttressed by the uncertainties of a cultural divide." In 1994, the University of Chicago Press published the two works in English as companion volumes.

== Adaptation ==
The novel was loosely adapted as the 1999 Hindi language film Hum Dil De Chuke Sanam, directed by Sanjay Leela Bhansali, although the film does not credit the book. The film was a huge hit because of its melodramatic picturisation.
