= Lakshmiswar Sinha =

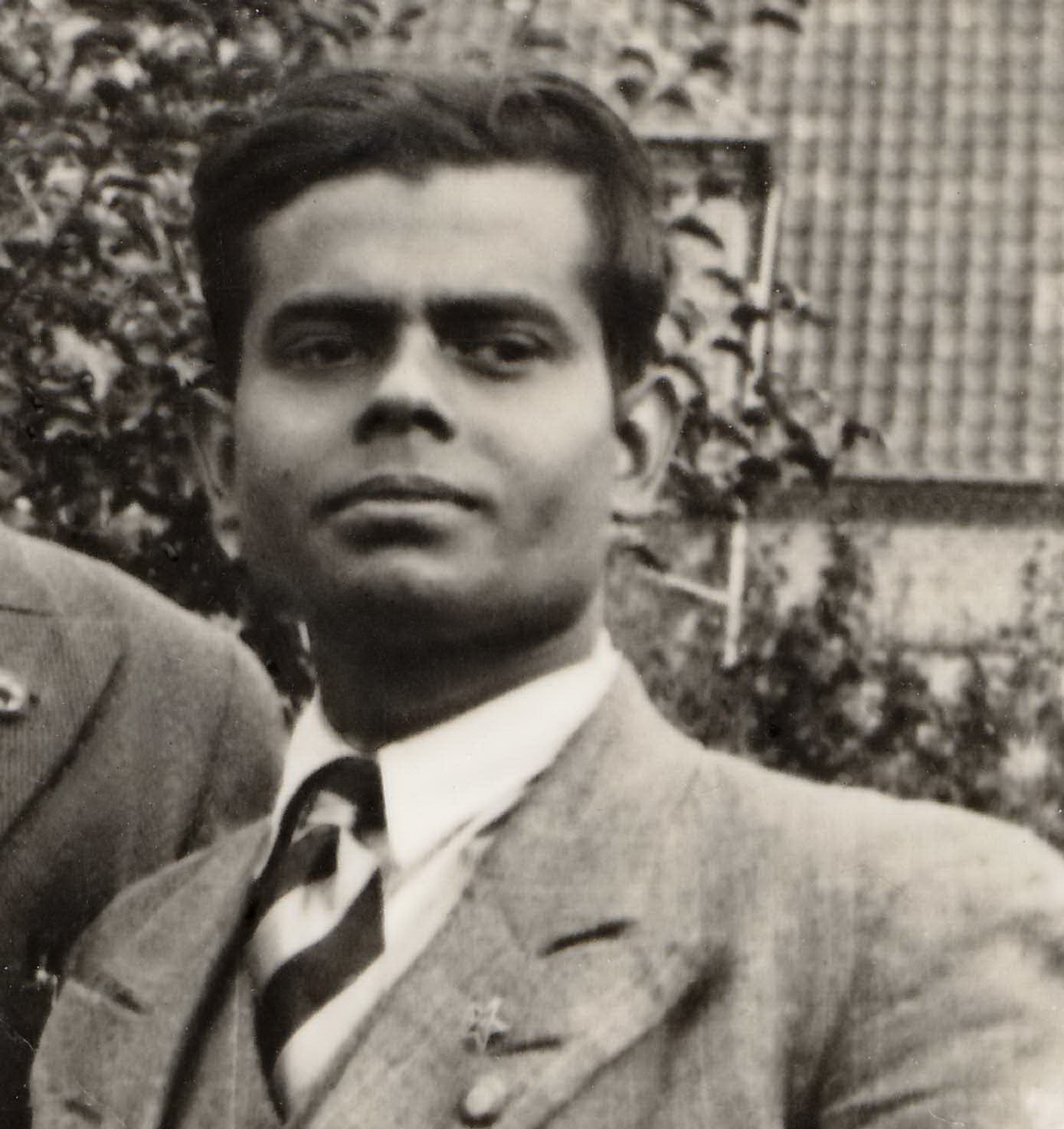
Lakshmiswar Sinha in Sweden about 1930

Lakshmiswar Sinha (June 6, 1905 in Rarisal in the north-east India - April 22, 1977 at Shantiniketan, India) was an Indian Esperantist and handicrafts teacher in Shantiniketan, Bengal. He was a disciple and friend of Tagore.

Sent to Sweden in 1928–29, he studied sloyd. In 1928, during a stay in Stockholm, he became an Esperantist and passed all SEI examinations. At the initiative of Ernfrid Malmgren in September 1929 he began a lecture tour. In Sweden he traveled over 10,000 km, gave more than 200 lectures to more than 30,000 people, and also twice on the radio. In autumn 1930 he toured in Estonia and Latvia, then for two months in Poland, 40 conferences in 22 cities in front of nearly 8000 people. In August 1931 he returned to India, where he worked for Esperanto writing articles and became the chief delegate of Universal Esperanto Association (UEA).

In autumn 1933 he returned to Sweden. In 1936 he published his book "Hindo Rigardas Svedlandon" (An Indian looks at Sweden). His translation of seven stories of Tagore "Malsata Ŝtono" (A hungry stone) was first published in the 1961 Serio Oriento-Okcidento.

The result of his efforts to create an Esperanto movement in India was the foundation of Bengala Esperanto-Instituto (Bengali Institute of Esperanto) in 1963 when his pamphlet appeared in Bengali Esperanto-Movado (Esperanto Movement). Eldona Societo Esperanto (Enterprise Edition Esperanto) published in 1966 in Sweden Sinha's autobiography Jaroj sur tero (Years on earth). Sinha's last work was published in 1974: Facila Esperanta lernolibro (Easy Esperanto Primer), in Bengali.

== Bibliography ==
- Sivaĝi, small original historical drama, 1928.
- 3 Bengalaj fabeloj (”Bengali Fables”): La dio, la malriĉulo kaj la mirindaj potoj; Fakiro kaj princo; Kio estas saĝo? (”The God, the Poor and the Miraculous Pots; Fakir and Prince; What is Wisdom?”), 1930 (also translated into Swedish), ISBN 91-7303-111-9.
- Kaj ĉio restas penso, sed ne faro (”and everything remains thoughts but no action”) 1931 (brochure on mutual understanding among people).
- Hindo Rigardas Svedlandon (”An Indian looks at Sweden”) Lakshmiswar Sinha, preface by Björn Collinder, Stockholm: Eld. Soc. Esperanto, 1936 (in archives of CDELI), 200 p. : Ill., Portr., 22 cm RERO: R003698615.
- Tagore: Malsata ŝtono (”A hungry stone”), Malmö: Eldona Esperanto Societo Serio Oriento-Okcidento 1, 1961 (translated from Bengali stories) (in Archives of CDELI RERO: R003147585).
- Esperanto-Movado (”Esperanto Movement”) 1963 Bengali.
- Jaroj sur tero (”Years on earth”), Malmö: Eldona Esperanto Societo, 1966 (autobiography) (in archives of CDELI RERO: R003789761).
- Facila Esperanta lernolibro (”Easy Esperanto Manual”) 1974 (in Bengali).
