= Xosé Neira Vilas =

Galician writer

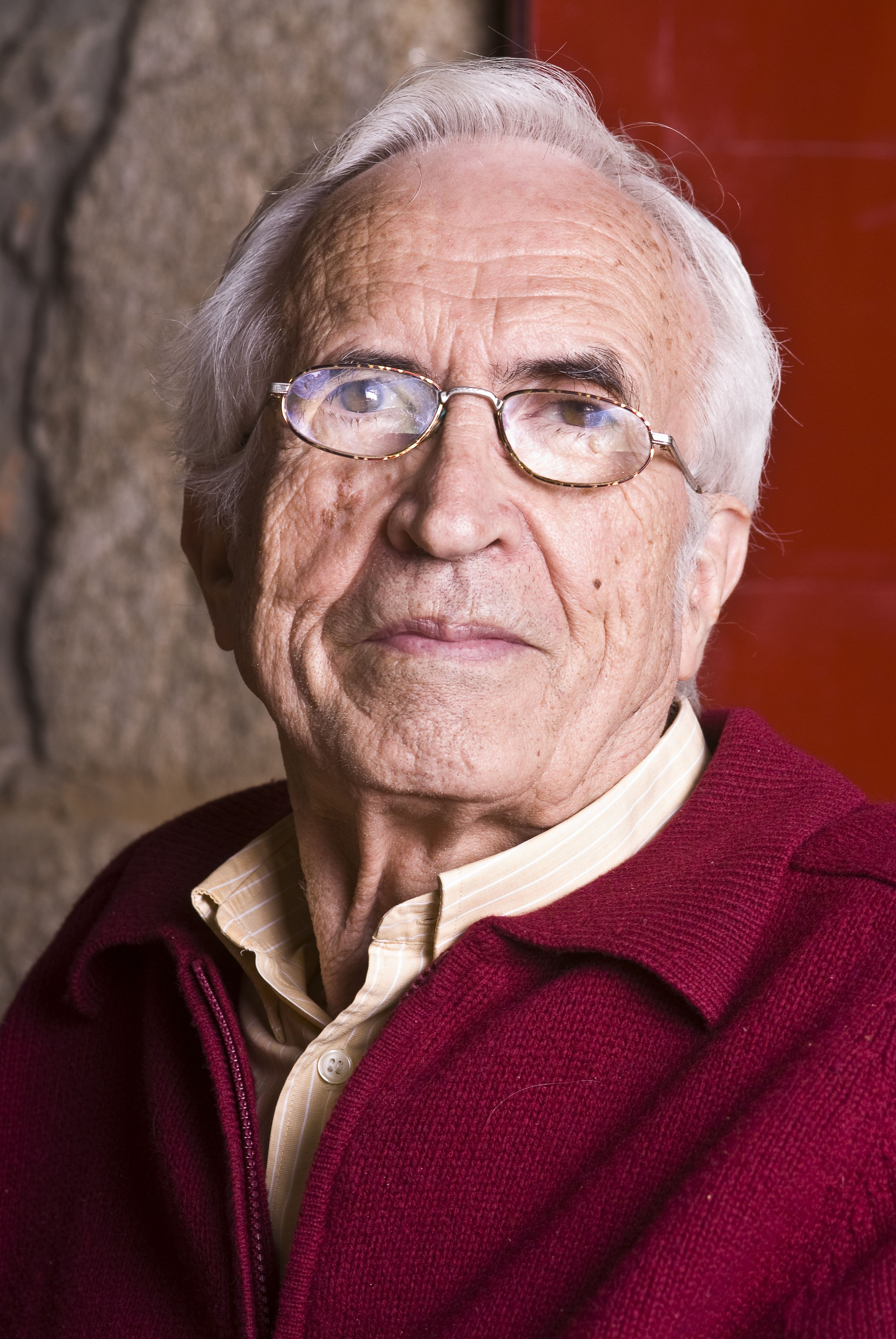
- Neira Vilas
- Born: November 3, 1928; Gres, Vila de Cruces, Galicia, Spain
- Died: November 27, 2015 (aged 87); Gres, Vila de Cruces, Galicia, Spain
- Occupation: Novelist, Poet
- Language: Galician, Spanish

Xosé Neira Vilas (November 3, 1928 – November 27, 2015) was a Galician writer.

== Life ==
Son of peasants, he studied finances by mail. In 1949 he emigrated to Argentina, where he contacted with authors close to Galicianism as Luís Seoane, Rafael Dieste, Ramón Suárez Picallo, Lorenzo Varela and Ramón de Valenzuela. In 1953 he founded Mocedades Galeguistas (Galicianist Youths) and in 1957 he married writer Anisia Miranda. In 1961 he left Argentina for Cuba. He died in 2015, aged 87.

== List of works in Galician ==
Interview to Neira Vilas in Fundación Xosé Neira Vilas in Gres, Vila de Cruces.

=== Prose ===
- Memoirs of a Peasant Boy. Edicións Follas Novas, 1961. Translated into English by Camilo Ogando (2007).
- Xente no rodicio. Editorial Galaxia, 1965.
- Camiño bretemoso. Galaxia, 1967.
- Historias de emigrantes. Patronato da Cultura Galega de Montevideo, 1968.
- A muller de ferro. Galaxia, 1969.
- Remuíño de sombras. Editorial Castrelos, 1972.
- Lar. Akal, 1973.
- Aqueles anos do Moncho. Akal, 1977; Colección Arealonga.
- O ciclo do neno. Akal, 1978. Included Memorias dun neno labrego, Cartas a Lelo e Aqueles anos do Moncho.
- Nai. Akal, 1980; Colección Arealonga.
- Querido Tomás. Ediciós do Castro, 1980.
- Pan. Galaxia, 1986.
- Tempo novo. Ediciós do Castro, 1987.
- Papeis. Castromil, 1992.
- Charamuscas. Galaxia, 1993. Included Lar, Nai e Pan.
- Contos de tres mundos. Edicións Xerais de Galicia, 1995.
- O home de pau. Xerais, 1999.
- Relatos mariñeiros. Xerais, 2003.
- A fuxida de Manuel. Pío García Edicións, 2007.
- Esperando o leiteiro. Galaxia, 2012.

=== Literature for children ===
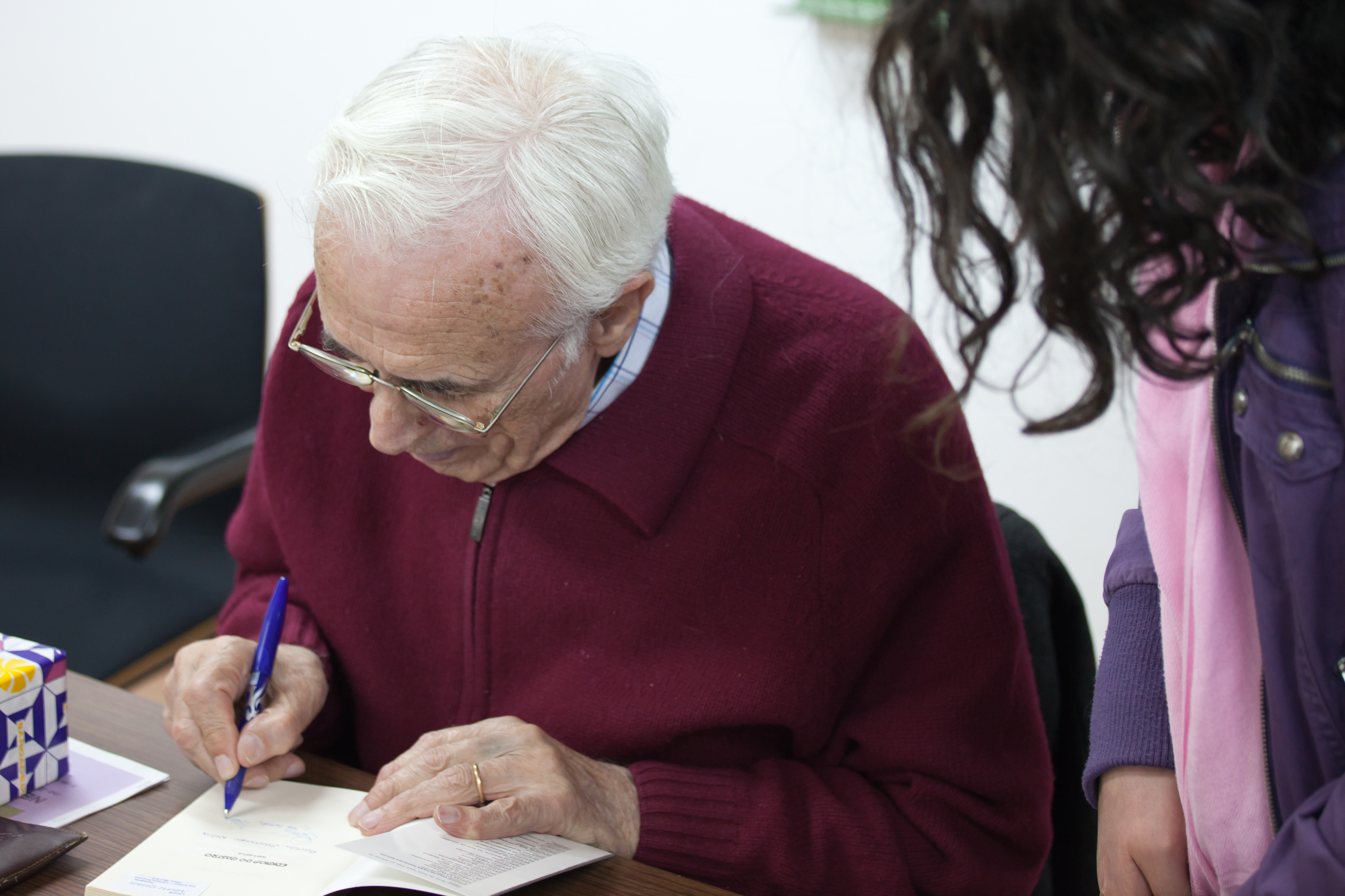
Neira Vilas signing.

- O cabaliño de buxo, Ediciós do Castro, 1971.
- Cartas a Lelo, Ediciós do Castro, 1971.
- Espantallo amigo. Ediciós do Castro, 1971.
- A marela Taravela. Edicións Celta, 1976.
- Contos vellos pra rapaces novos. Ediciós do Castro, 1983.
- De cando o Suso foi carteiro, Ediciós do Castro, 1988.
- Chegan forasteiros. Ediciós do Castro, 1992.
- O xardín de Irene. Edicións Embora, 2015.

=== Poetry ===
- Dende lonxe. 1960.
- Inquedo latexar. Xistral, 1969.
- Poesía recadada. Espiral Maior, 1994.
- Dende Gres. Espiral Maior, 2004.
- Cantos de sol a sol. GaliNova, 2014.
- Cantos que veñen de lonxe. CD-book with music by Xervasio Sánchez, 2014.

=== Essay ===
- Galegos no Golfo de México. Ediciós do Castro, 1980.
- Encrucilladas. 1981.
- Castelao en Cuba. Ediciós do Castro, 1983.
- A prensa galega en Cuba. Edicións do Castro, 1985.
- Índice da revista El Eco de Galicia (A Habana, 1878-1901). Ediciós do Castro, 1988.
- Guerrilleiros. Ediciós do Castro, 1991.
- Na outra banda do mar. Editorial Compostela, 1992.
- Rosalía de Castro e Cuba. Patronato Rosalía de Castro, 1992.
- Memoria da emigración. I. Ediciós do Castro, 1994.
- Eduardo Blanco-Amor, dende Buenos Aires. Edicións do Castro, 1995.
- A lingua galega en Cuba. Consello da Cultura Galega, 1995.
- Memoria da emigración II. Ediciós do Castro, 1995.
- Memoria da emigración III. Ediciós do Castro, 1996.
- Galegos que loitaron pola independencia de Cuba. Ediciós do Castro, 1998.
- Crónicas galegas de América. Rolda primeira. Ediciós do Castro, 1999.
- Crónicas galegas de América. Rolda segunda. Ediciós do Castro, 2000.
- Manuel Murguía e os galegos da Habana. Ediciós do Castro, 2000.
- A cultura galega en Buenos Aires, 1950-1960. Real Academia Galega, 2001.
- Crónicas galegas de América. Rolda terceira. Ediciós do Castro, 2002.
- Prosas varias. Fundación Otero Pedrayo, 2004.
- O sarillo do tempo. Xerais, 2004.
- Xentes e camiños. Xerais, 2005.
- Vinte anos retornando. Xerais, 2006.
- Arredor do mundo. Xerais, 2007.
- Neira Vilas, os anos da Arxentina: 1949-1961: textos recuperados. Galaxia, 2008.
- Actas do Congreso Manuel María. Literatura e Nación. Fundación Manuel María, 2009.
- Encontros con Laxeiro. Ir Indo Edicións, 2009.
- Lóstregos. Xerais, 2009.
- Presenza galega en Cuba. Xerais, 2010.
- Penúltimo dietario. Xerais, 2011.
- 100 anos do Himno galego. Edicións Embora, 2012.
- Cancela aberta. Xerais, 2013.
- Neira Vilas. Memoria gráfica. Edicións Bolanda, 2013.
- Con Anisia Miranda na Costa da Morte. Embora, 2014.
- Días de Cuba. Galaxia, 2014.
- Epistolario diverso. Edicións Embora, 2014.
- Galicia en Cuba. Lingua, Rosalía, loitas. Consello da Cultura Galega, 2014.
- Isaac Díaz Pardo. Crónica dunha fecunda amizade. Edicións Bolanda, 2014.
- Semente galega en América. Bolanda, 2015.

== List of works in Spanish ==
=== Prose ===
- En la extraña ciudad: cuentos y recuentos. Arte y Literatura, La Habana, 1982.

=== Essay ===
- Los días cubanos de Alfonso Castelao. Unión, La Habana, 1988.
- Presencia diversa de los gallegos en Cuba. Xunta de Galicia, 2007.
