= Mangpu =

Mungpoo मङ्गपू
- Small town
- Mungpoo Cinchona Plantation
- Location in West Bengal, India Mungpoo (India)
- Coordinates: 26°58′17″N 88°22′16″E
- Country: India
- State: West Bengal
- District: Darjeeling

Population (2011)
  - Total: 1,109
- Time zone: UTC+5:30 (IST)
- Postal code: 734313
- Lok Sabha constituency: Darjeeling
- Vidhan Sabha constituency: Kurseong
- Website: darjeeling.gov.in

Mungpoo(मङ्गपू) also referred to as Mungpoo Cinchona Plantation is a village in the Kurseong Vidhan Sabha Rangli Development Block in the Darjeeling Sadar Subdivision of the Darjeeling district in the state of West Bengal, India.

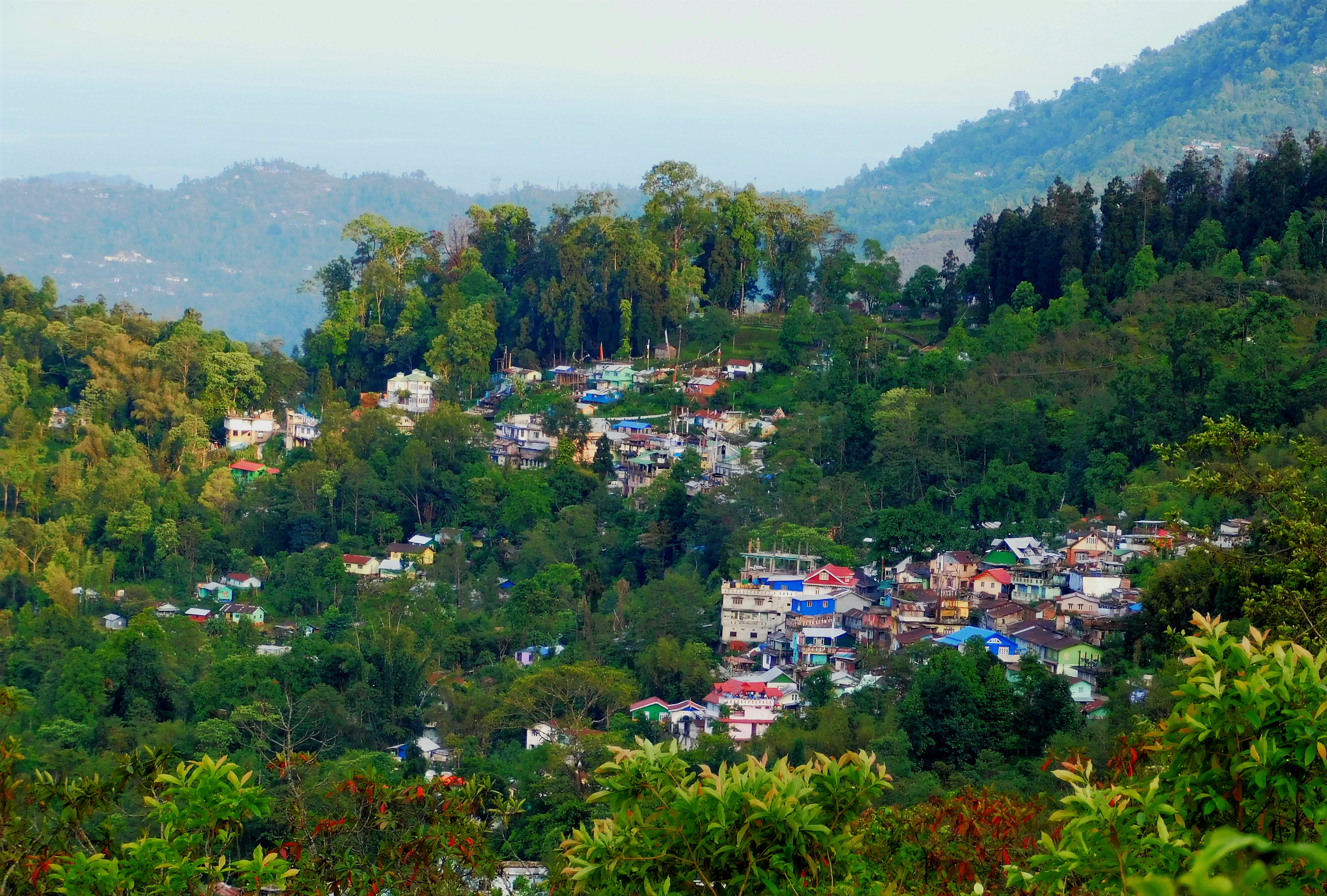
View of Mungpoo

== History ==
The ancient Incas, in what is now Peru, knew that the bark of a tree had miraculous property of curing Malaria. Carl Linnaeus established the botanical genus of Cinchona in 1742. Dr. Thomas Anderson, Superintendent of Royal Botanical Garden at Calcutta, started his experimental trial for cultivation of Cinchona in the Darjeeling Hills and in 1862 selected the Mungpoo hills for commercial cultivation. After successful establishment of Cinchona plantations at Mungpoo, it was extended to Munsong, Rongo, Latpanchar and Ambotia.

The Directorate of Cinchona and Other Medicinal Plants started functioning in Darjeeling in 1862, initially for growing Cinchona trees and to produce the life-saving anti-Malarial drug, Quinine, from its bark. Later, other medicinal and specialised plants like ipecac were also grown.

The Nobel laureate poet Rabindranath Tagore visited Mungpoo quite often between 1938 and 1940. He used to stay at the residence of his protége Maitreyi Devi, who was herself a renowned poet and novelist. Maitreyi Devi's husband Manmohan Sen was at that time the director of the quinine factory in Mungpoo. The bungalow has now been converted into Rabindra Bhavan, a museum containing Tagore's photographs, paintings, writings, and other paraphernalia. The museum also contains furniture that was designed and carved by Rathindranath Tagore. Maitreyi Devi recorded the stays of Rabindranath in her book Mongpute Rabindranath (রবীন্দ্রনাথ মংপুতে), the English translation of which is called Tagore By The Fire Side.

== Geography ==
Places and tea estates in the north-eastern portion of Darjeeling Sadar subdivision (including Rangli Rangliot CD block) and Kurseong subdivision in Darjeeling district
CT: census town, R: rural/ urban centre, N: neighbourhood, H: hill centre, NP: national park/ wildlife sanctuary, TE: tea estate, TA: tourist attraction
Abbreviations used in names – TG for Tea Garden (town/village), TE for Tea Estate
Owing to space constraints in the small map, the actual locations in a larger map may vary slightly

=== Location ===
Mungpoo is located at 26.966000°N 88.372361°E

Mungpoo is 32 km east of Darjeeling. The elevation varies from 1,000 to 6,170 ft (300 to 1,880 m).

=== Area overview ===
The map alongside shows the eastern portion of the Darjeeling Himalayan hill region and a small portion of the Terai region in its eastern and southern fringes, all of it in the Darjeeling district. In the Darjeeling Sadar subdivision 61.00% of the total population lives in the rural areas and 39.00% of the population lives in the urban areas. In the Kurseong subdivision 58.41% of the total population lives in the rural areas and 41.59% lives in the urban areas. There are 78 tea gardens/estates (the figure varies slightly according to different sources), in the district, producing and largely exporting Darjeeling tea. It engages a large proportion of the population directly/ indirectly. Some tea gardens were identified in the 2011 census as census towns or villages. Such places are marked in the map as CT (census town) or R (rural/ urban centre). Specific tea estate pages are marked TE.

Note: The map alongside presents some of the notable locations in the subdivision. All places marked in the map are linked in the larger full screen map.

== Demographics ==
According to the 2011 Census of India, Mungpoo Cinchona Plantation had a total population of 25,000 1,109 (49%) were males and (51%) were females. There were 64 persons in the age range of 0 to 6 years. The total number of literate people in Mungpoo Cinchona Plantation was 1,023 (92.25% of the population over 6 years).

== Education ==
Saraswati Higher Secondary School is an English-medium coeducational institution established in 1945. It has facilities for teaching from class V to class XII. Gyanpith Higher Secondary School is another coeducational school located at Rungbee Division of Mungpoo which is under the WBCHSE curriculum. Sarada High School is also a coeducational school located at Mungpoor Division of Mungpoo which provides education up to Madhyamik level. Labdah Junior High School is another coeducational school which provides education up to class 10. Kasturi High School is the only school in Mungpoo which is Nepali medium till class 10 for both boys and girls. Other than these school there are numerous private/primary schools in Mungpoo viz., St. Joseph's School, St. Mangal Academy, Good Start Academy, Dolphin Nursery School, Labdah CP Primary School, Gramsewak Primary School, Hill Angels' School, St. Anthony' School, Dr. Ambedkar Memorial Welfare School, Green Hill Academy, Siddhartha Memorial School, Green Mountain English School, etc.

== Healthcare ==
Mungpoo Government Cinchona Plantation Hospital is located below Nali Dara (which is the central meeting place of the whole Mungpoo region). Dowhill Central Hospital, with 40 beds, is located at Dow Hill and Latpanchar Cinchona Plantation Hospital, with 12 beds, is located at Latpanchar.

== Road connections ==
Mungpoo is located at a distance of 52 km from Siliguri, 40 km from Kalimpong and 32 km from Darjeeling town. Nearest Railway station is New Jalpaiguri Railway Station (NJP) and nearest Airport is Bagdogra Airport (IX-B). Mungpoo is almost 88.8 km far away from Gangtok and 67.3 km away from Mirik.
