= Om Prakash Mishra (academic) =

Indian academic

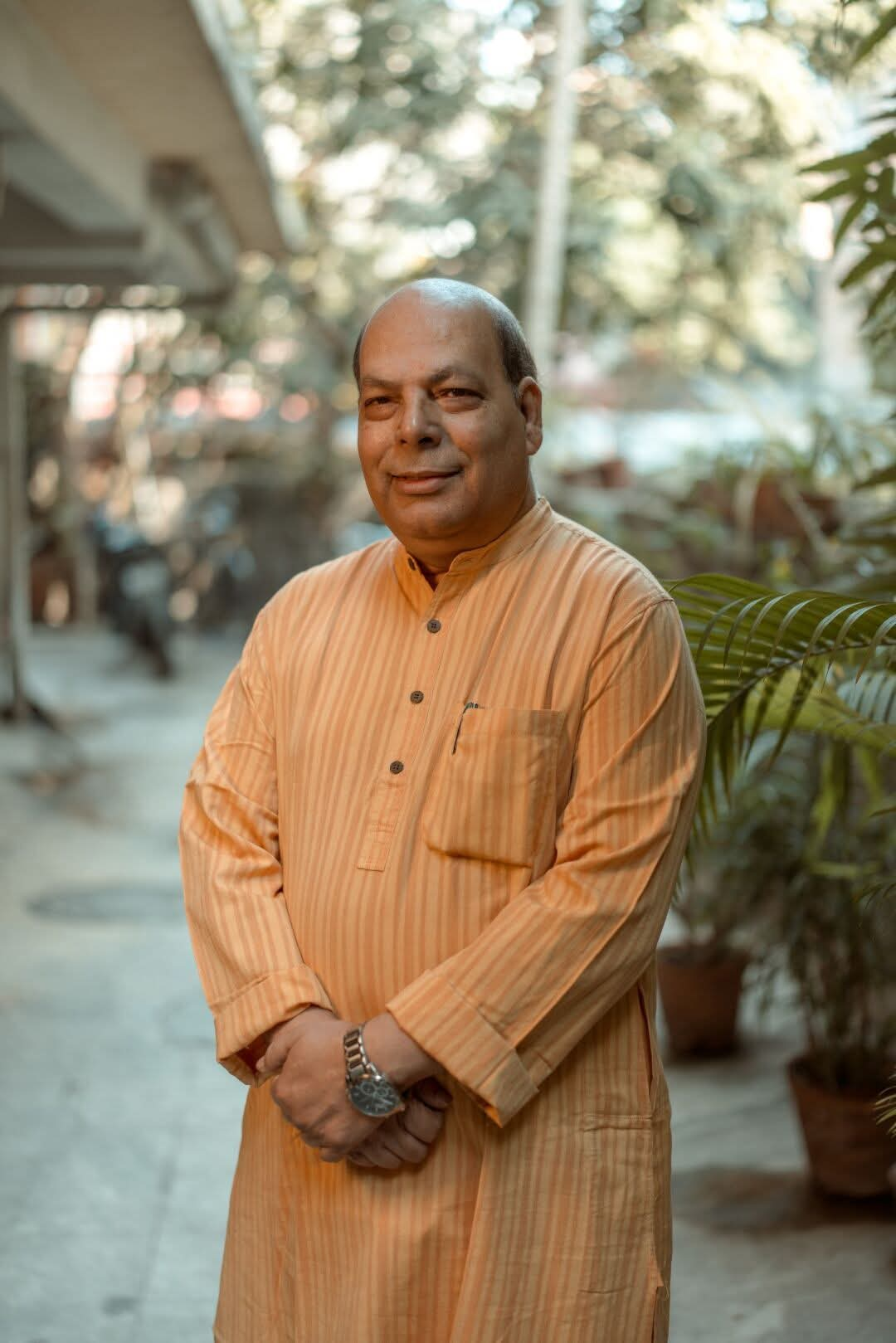

Personal details
- Born: Balurghat, West Bengal, India
- Education: PhD in International Politics
- Alma mater: Jawaharlal Nehru University, Jadavpur University, University of North Bengal
- Occupation: Academic, Politician

Professor Om Prakash Mishra is an Indian academic, strategy expert, politician, political scientist and international relations expert, specializing in international relations, foreign policy, national security, refugee studies, and higher education policy. A long-serving faculty member of Jadavpur University, he has held several leadership positions in Indian higher education and public policy institutions, including appointments in university administration, national advisory bodies, and research organizations. His work spans scholarship, academic governance, and public engagement on issues relating to international affairs, migration, security studies, and education policy.

== Academic and administrative career ==
After beginning his teaching career in the West Bengal Educational Service, including service at Jhargram Raj College, Mishra joined the Department of International Relations at Jadavpur University in November 1987.

At Jadavpur University (1987-2026), Mishra taught and conducted research in international relations, strategic studies, foreign policy analysis, national security, refugee studies, migration studies, and international organizations. He served as Head of the Department of International Relations from 1994 to 1996, and again from 2018 to 2020, and subsequently became Founder-Coordinator of the Centre for Refugee Studies. He later served as Dean of the Faculty of Arts, holding the office in the year 2020.

On 28 September 2022, Mishra was appointed Interim Vice-Chancellor of the University of North Bengal following the removal of the incumbent vice-chancellor. He served in that capacity until 2023, overseeing the administration of the university during a period of institutional transition. Concurrently, from 2022 to 2023, he held additional charge as Vice-Chancellor of Darjeeling Hills University, where he was associated with the establishment and early administration of the newly created institution.

Beyond his university appointments, Mishra held several national-level academic and policy positions. From the years 2004 to 2006, he served as a Member of the National Security Advisory Board (NSAB), Government of India, contributing to discussions on national security, strategic affairs, and foreign policy. From 2005 to 2006, he chaired the University Grants Commission (UGC) Expert Committee on Universities and Public Policy. From 2007 to 2010, he served as Pro Vice-Chancellor of the Indira Gandhi National Open University (IGNOU), New Delhi. He has served as an Independent Director of leading non-banking finance institution IFCI Ltd from the years 2010-2014. He has also served as member of the Board of Governors for leading management school MDI Gurgaon from 2010 to 2016..

Professor Om Prakash Mishra was awarded the "Siksha Ratna" (Jewel of Education) by the Department of Higher Education, Government of West Bengal, in September 2019. The award recognizes outstanding contributions to teaching, academic administration, and institutional development within the state.

Mishra has also played an active role in debates concerning higher education policy and university governance. In 2023, he headed a special committee constituted by the Educationists' Forum to examine the University Grants Commission's draft regulations concerning the appointment of vice-chancellors in state universities. The committee submitted a report to the Government of West Bengal expressing concerns regarding the proposed selection process and its implications for institutional autonomy and federal principles in higher education governance. In 2025, he served as a member of an eight-member committee constituted by the West Bengal Higher Education Department to review the UGC Draft Regulations, 2025, and submitted recommendations relating to teacher recruitment, promotion policies, and vice-chancellor appointments.

Mishra has been associated with several academic and policy institutions outside the university system. He served as Member Secretary of the Global India Foundation from November 2006, where he contributed to research initiatives, publications, conferences, and policy discussions relating to international relations, globalization, governance, development, and public affairs. He has also been associated with the Institute of Development Studies Kolkata (IDSK), serving as President and subsequently as Honorary President, and contributing to the institute's academic and institutional development.

In addition to his administrative appointments, Mishra has participated in multiple academic committees, policy forums, curriculum-development initiatives, and scholarly conferences in India and abroad, having visited over 25 nations during the course of his career. He served various academic committees and played important role in curriculum development and course structuring. He is an alumnus of the prestigious International Visitors Leadership Program of the Government of the United States of America: Visiting Fellow at Oxford University. His research and publications have focused on international relations, foreign policy, national security, refugee and migration studies, and higher education. He has authored and edited scholarly works and supervised research in these fields.

== Other sources ==
- "My Neta : Dr. Om Prakash Mishra". My Neta.
- Omprakash Mishra SouthAsia Commons
