= Diary of a Short-Sighted Adolescent =

1989 novel by Mircea Eliade

- Cover of the first edition
- Author: Mircea Eliade
- Original title: Romanul adolescentului miop
- Translator: Christopher Moncrieff
- Language: Romanian
- Publisher: Editura Minerva
- Publication date: 1989
- Publication place: Romania
- English publication date: 12 April 2016
- Pages: 476
- ISBN: 9789732100196

Diary of a Short-Sighted Adolescent (Romanian: Romanul adolescentului miop) is a novel by the Romanian writer Mircea Eliade. It is based on Eliade's time in high-school and tells the story of a precocious teenager with literary ambitions. The book was written in the 1920s when Eliade was still a teenager. It was discovered after the author's death and published in 1989 in Romania. An English translation was published in 2016 in the UK.

It was followed by Gaudeamus, written in 1928, which is based on Eliade's university time. Gaudeamus was published in English for the first time in April 2018 by Istros Books, translated by Christopher Bartholomew .

== Composition ==
Eliade began to write the novel in 1921 under the title Jurnalul unui om sucit. In 1923 it had taken the name Romanul unui om sucit, until the final version was written in 1925 as Romanul adolescentului miop. While he wrote the book, Eliade thought it was the first time a novel about adolescence was written by an actual adolescent.

== Publication ==
The book was discovered after Eliade's death and was published in 1989 in Romanian. An English translation by Christopher Moncrieff was published in 2016 by Istros Books, a publisher in the UK.

== Reception ==
Nicholas Lezard of The Guardian wrote in 2016: "Eliade may be describing the life of a student in a Romanian lycée of almost a century ago, but anyone who has ever been at school, full of ideals but also too shy to speak to the opposite sex, or incapable of revising for an exam until the very last minute, will relate to this. As will anyone who has ever committed their private thoughts to paper, as the true record of their soul and a rebuke to posterity."

Sorin Alexandrescu wrote in Guernica (2016): "This ambition towards self-knowledge is what distinguishes Mircea Eliade’s novel from many others about adolescents. While the authors of such novels usually narrate events that reveal the hero’s uncertainty with respect to himself, they do not depict the permanent self-questioning and the analysis of the mystery of identity as Mircea Eliade does."

Bryan Rennie wrote in the LA Review of Books (2016): "The novel has much to say about the development of Eliade’s views — on writing, on politics, and on religion. Just as literary and artistic representation can help us better understand the experience of the doctor and the patient, so too Eliade’s creative writing helps us better understand the experience of a religious seeker and scholar. [...] Moncrieff’s translation, which adopts the idiom of the old English grammar school system, lends a vaguely unreal, Harry Potter–like air to the novel, enlivening the intellectual content."
