= Gaudeamus (novel) =

1989 novel by Mircea Eliade

- Cover of the English Translation
- Author: Mircea Eliade
- Original title: Gaudeamus
- Language: Romanian
- Publisher: Editura Minerva
- Publication date: 1989
- Publication place: Romania
- English publication date: April 2018

Gaudeamus is a novel written in 1928 by the Romanian writer Mircea Eliade, portraying him at college during the Interbellum. It was only published as a single volume in 1989. It is the sequel to Diary of a Short-Sighted Adolescent (Romanian: Romanul adolescentului miop), which is based on Eliade's time in high school.

Gaudeamus was published in English for the first time in April 2018 by Istros Books, with a foreword by Bryan Rennie.

== Background ==
As Bryan Rennie writes in the foreword of the 2018 English edition: "Mircea Eliade’s Gaudeamus, written between February and March of 1928, is a coming-of-age novel based on his undergraduate years at the University of Bucharest (1925 to 1928). His earlier novel, Romanul adolescenului miop (Diary of a Short-Sighted Adolescent, Istros Books, 2014) had focused on the final years of his Liceu (high school) education and had been serialised in its entirety in the Bucharest periodicals Cuvântul, Viața Literară, and Universul Literar in the ’20s, but the manuscript of Gaudeamus had a different trajectory. Finished before Eliade’s departure for India in 1928, it remained among his papers in the family house on Strada Melodiei in Bucharest. Only three pages, described as an “excerpt” from Gaudeamus, appeared in Viața literară in March 1928. Eliade attempted without success to place the manuscript with the publisher, Cartea Românească, but the novel was to wait more than fifty years to appear in print. Eliade did revisit and reread it in 1932–33, when, according to his Autobiography, he found it “both lyrical and frenzied, too pretentious, timidly indiscreet, and quite lacking in grandeur”. He never again tried to have it published, nor, indeed to have any contact with it. The house was demolished in 1935 and the manuscript passed into the possession of his younger sister Cornelia (Corina) Alexandrescu. It was not until 1981 that a high school teacher and Eliade enthusiast, Mircea Handoca, along with the philosopher, essayist, and poet, Constantin Noica, were given access to Alexandrescu's attic and recovered the manuscript. Together they assembled the first 2,500 typed pages of Eliade's writings from 1921 up to 1928. Several chapters from Gaudeamus appeared in three issues of the journal Manuscriptum in 1983, three years before Eliade's death, but the entire text of the novel did not appear until 1986 when it was published in Revista de istoire și teorie literară and then again as a single volume with Romanul adolescenului miop in 1989. Curiously, the three-page passage from Viața literară was absent from the final version of the manuscript. Thereafter Gaudeamus was translated into French in 1992 and Italian in 2012 and now it appears for the first time in English."
