= Bryan Rennie =

Bryan Rennie may refer to:

- Bryan Rennie (historian)
- Bryan Rennie (rugby union)
