= Dingir =

Cuneiform sign of deities and sky

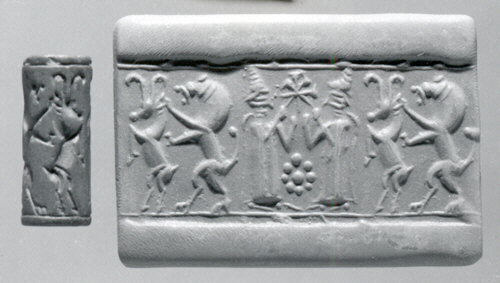
The dingir sign worshiped by two figures on a cylinder seal from Mitanni, 16th–14th century BC

Dingir ⟨𒀭⟩, usually transliterated DIĜIR (Sumerian pronunciation: [tiŋiɾ]), (Note: By Assyriological convention, capitals identify a cuneiform sign used as a word, while the phonemic value of a sign in a given context is given in lower case.) is a Sumerian word for 'god' or 'goddess'. Its cuneiform sign is most commonly employed as the determinative for religious names and related concepts, in which case it is not pronounced and is conventionally transliterated as a superscript ⟨d⟩, e.g. ^{d}Inanna.

The Sumerian cuneiform sign by itself was originally an ideogram for the Sumerian word an ('sky' or 'heaven'); its use was then extended to a logogram for the word diĝir ('god' or 'goddess') and the supreme deity of the Sumerian pantheon Anu, and a phonogram for the syllable /an/. Akkadian cuneiform took over all these uses and added to them a logographic reading for the native ilum and from that a syllabic reading of /il/. In Hittite orthography, the syllabic value of the sign was again only an.

The concept of divinity in Sumerian is closely associated with the heavens, as is evident from the fact that the cuneiform sign doubles as the ideogram for 'sky', and that its original shape is the picture of a star. The eight-pointed star was a chief symbol for the goddess Inanna. The original association of 'divinity' is thus with 'bright' or 'shining' hierophanies in the sky.

== Cuneiform sign ==
=== Sumerian ===

The Sumerian sign DIĜIR ⟨𒀭⟩ originated as a star-shaped ideogram indicating a god in general, or the Sumerian god Anu, the supreme father of the gods. Dingir also meant 'sky' or 'heaven', in contrast with ki, which meant 'earth'. Its Emesal pronunciation was dimer. (The use of m instead of ĝ [ŋ] was a typical phonological feature in the Emesal dialect.)

The plural of diĝir can be diĝir-diĝir, among others.

=== Assyrian ===
The Assyrian sign DIĜIR (ASH ⟨𒀸⟩ and MAŠ ⟨𒈦⟩, see could mean:

- the Akkadian nominal stem il- meaning 'god' or 'goddess', derived from the Semitic ʾil-
- the god Anum (An)
- the Akkadian word šamû, meaning 'sky'
- the syllables an and il (from the Akkadian word god: An or Il, or from gods with these names)
- a preposition meaning "at" or "to"
- a determinative indicating that the following word is the name of a god

According to one interpretation, DINGIR could also refer to a priest or priestess although there are other Akkadian words ēnu and ēntu that are also translated priest and priestess. For example, nin-dingir (lady divine) meant a priestess who received foodstuffs at the temple of Enki in the city of Eridu.

=== Encoding ===
The cuneiform sign was encoded in Unicode 5.0 under its name AN at the code point U+1202D 𒀭.

== See also ==
- Divine name
- Mesopotamian mythology
- Anunnaki – Group of ancient Mesopotamian deities

== Citations ==
=== References ===
- Edzard, Dietz Otto (2003). Sumerian Grammar. Handbook of Oriental Studies. Vol. 71. Atlanta: Society of Biblical Literature. ISBN 1-58983-252-3.
- Hayes, John L. (2000). A Manual of Sumerian Grammar and Texts. Aids and Research Tools in Ancient Near Eastern Studies (Second revised ed.). Malibu: Undena Publications. ISBN 0-89003-508-1.
