= Sorin Alexandrescu =

Romanian writer

Sorin Alexandrescu (born 18 August 1937) is a Romanian-born academic, literary critic, semiotician, linguist, essayist, and translator.

Born in Bucharest as the son of Constantin, a magistrate, and Ileana, Mircea Eliade's sister, he graduated from the "Mihai Viteazu" High School in his hometown (1955), and after that, from the Faculty of Letters, University of Bucharest (1959). After teaching comparative literature at the University of Bucharest, where he was considered to be a structuralist, he was sent in 1969 by the Romanian authorities to teach Romanian language and literature at universities in Amsterdam and Groningen. In 1974 he decided to defect.

In 1976, he founded the International Journal of Roumanian Studies.

During the 1989 Romanian Revolution, he returned to Romania as a correspondent for a Dutch newspaper.

In 1998, he was named presidential adviser for culture. In 2001, he settled permanently in Romania again. That same year, he was one of the founders of the so-called Centrul de Excelență în Studiul Imaginii at the University of Bucharest, together with Dan Grigorescu, Mihai Zamfir, Laura Mesina, Vlad Alexandrescu, Vasile Morar and Zoe Petre.

== Books ==
- The Logic of Personages, 1973
- Logique du personnage: reflexions sur l'univers faulknerien, (1974)
- Dimitrie Cantemir: Roemeens historicus en politicus 1673-1723, Bussum 1975
- Transformational grammar and the Rumanian language, 1977
- Richard Rorty, 1995
- Figurative of the Art. Beginning and End. 20th Century in Romania, 1998
- Paradoxul român, 1998
- Identitate în ruptură. Mentalitati românești postbelice, 2000
- La modernité a l'Est. 13 aperçus sur la literature roumaine, 2000
