= Mircea Eliade =

Romanian historian of religion (1907–1986)

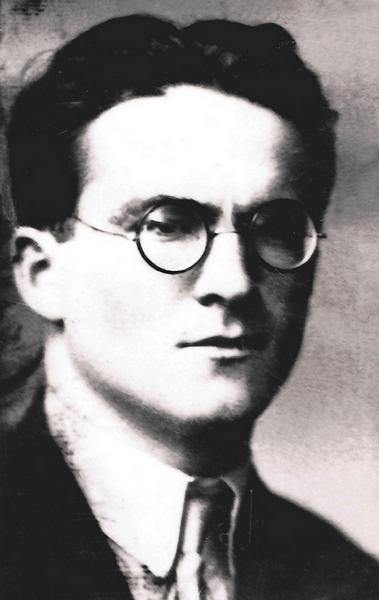
- Eliade in 1933
- Born: March 13, 1907; Bucharest, Kingdom of Romania
- Died: April 22, 1986 (aged 79); Chicago, Illinois, United States
- Resting place: Oak Woods Cemetery
- Citizenship: Romania; United States
- Education: University of Calcutta; University of Bucharest
- Occupations: Historian, philosopher, short-story writer, journalist, essayist, novelist
- Parent(s): Gheorghe Eliade; Jeana née Vasilescu
- Writing career
- Language: Romanian; French; German; English
- Period: 1921–1986
- Genres: Fantasy, autobiography, travel literature
- Subjects: History of religion, philosophy of religion, cultural history, political history
- Movements: Modernism; Criterion; Trăirism

Mircea Eliade (Romanian: [ˈmirt͡ʃe̯a eliˈade]; 13 March [O.S. 28 February] 1907 – April 22, 1986) was a Romanian historian of religion, fiction writer, philosopher, and professor at the University of Chicago. One of the most influential scholars of religion of the 20th century and interpreter of religious experience, he established paradigms in religious studies. His theory that hierophanies form the basis of religion, splitting the human experience of reality into sacred and profane space and time, has proved influential. One of his most instrumental contributions to religious studies was his theory of eternal return, which holds that myths and rituals do not simply commemorate hierophanies, but (at least in the minds of the religious) actually participate in them.

Eliade's literary works belong to the fantastic and autobiographical genres. The best known are the novels Maitreyi ('La Nuit Bengali' or 'Bengal Nights', 1933), Noaptea de Sânziene ('The Forbidden Forest', 1955), Isabel și apele diavolului ('Isabel and the Devil's Waters'), and Romanul Adolescentului Miop ('Novel of the Nearsighted Adolescent', 1989); the novellas Domnișoara Christina ('Miss Christina', 1936) and Tinerețe fără tinerețe ('Youth Without Youth', 1976); and the short stories Secretul doctorului Honigberger ('The Secret of Dr. Honigberger', 1940) and La Țigănci ('With the Gypsy Girls', 1963).

Early in his life, Eliade was a journalist and essayist, a disciple of Romanian philosopher and journalist Nae Ionescu, and a member of the literary society Criterion. In the 1940s, he served as cultural attaché of the Kingdom of Romania to the United Kingdom and Portugal. Several times during the late 1930s, Eliade publicly expressed his support for the Iron Guard, a Romanian Christian fascist organization. His involvement with fascism at the time, as well as his other far-right connections, came under frequent criticism after World War II.

Eliade had fluent command of five languages (Romanian, French, German, Italian, and English) and a reading knowledge of three others (Hebrew, Persian, and Sanskrit). In 1990 he was elected a posthumous member of the Romanian Academy.

== Biography ==
=== Childhood ===
Born in Bucharest, he was the son of Romanian Land Forces officer Gheorghe Eliade (whose original surname was Ieremia) and Jeana née Vasilescu. An Orthodox believer, Gheorghe Eliade registered his son's birth four days before the actual date, to coincide with the liturgical calendar feast of the Forty Martyrs of Sebaste. Mircea Eliade had a sister, Corina, the mother of semiologist Sorin Alexandrescu. His family moved between Tecuci and Bucharest, ultimately settling in the capital in 1914, and purchasing a house on Melodiei Street, near Piața Rosetti, where Mircea Eliade resided until late in his teens.

Eliade kept a particularly fond memory of his childhood and, later in life, wrote about the impact various unusual episodes and encounters had on his mind. In one instance during the World War I Romanian Campaign, when Eliade was about ten years of age, he witnessed the bombing of Bucharest by German zeppelins and the patriotic fervor in the occupied capital at news that Romania was able to stop the Central Powers' advance into Moldavia.

He described this stage in his life as marked by an unrepeatable epiphany. Recalling his entrance into a drawing room that an "eerie iridescent light" had turned into "a fairy-tale palace", he wrote,

I practiced for many years [the] exercise of recapturing that epiphanic moment, and I would always find again the same plenitude. I would slip into it as into a fragment of time devoid of duration—without beginning, middle, or end. During my last years of lycée, when I struggled with profound attacks of melancholy, I still succeeded at times in returning to the golden green light of that afternoon. [...] But even though the beatitude was the same, it was now impossible to bear because it aggravated my sadness too much. By this time I knew the world to which the drawing room belonged [...] was a world forever lost.

Robert Ellwood, a professor of religion who did his graduate studies under Mircea Eliade, saw this type of nostalgia as one of the most characteristic themes in Eliade's life and academic writings.

=== Adolescence and literary debut ===
After completing his primary education at the school on Mântuleasa Street, Eliade attended the Spiru Haret National College in the same class as Arșavir Acterian, Haig Acterian, and Petre Viforeanu (and several years the senior of Nicolae Steinhardt, who eventually became a close friend of Eliade's). Among his other colleagues was future philosopher Constantin Noica and Noica's friend, future art historian Barbu Brezianu.

As a child, Eliade was fascinated with the natural world, which formed the setting of his very first literary attempts, as well as with Romanian folklore and the Christian faith as expressed by peasants. Growing up, he aimed to find and record what he believed was the common source of all religious traditions. The young Eliade's interest in physical exercise and adventure led him to pursue mountaineering and sailing, and he also joined the Romanian Boy Scouts.

With a group of friends, he designed and sailed a boat on the Danube, from Tulcea to the Black Sea. In parallel, Eliade grew estranged from the educational environment, becoming disenchanted with the discipline required and obsessed with the idea that he was uglier and less virile than his colleagues. To cultivate his willpower, he would force himself to swallow insects and only slept four to five hours a night. At one point, Eliade was failing four subjects, among which was the study of the Romanian language.

Instead, he became interested in natural science and chemistry, as well as the occult, and wrote short pieces on entomological subjects. Despite his father's concern that he was in danger of losing his already weak eyesight, Eliade read passionately. One of his favorite authors was Honoré de Balzac, whose work he studied carefully. Eliade also became acquainted with the modernist short stories of Giovanni Papini and social anthropology studies by James George Frazer.

His interest in the two writers led him to learn Italian and English in private, and he also began studying Persian and Hebrew. At the time, Eliade became acquainted with Saadi's poems and the ancient Mesopotamian Epic of Gilgamesh. He was also interested in philosophy—studying, among others, Socrates, Vasile Conta, and the Stoics Marcus Aurelius and Epictetus, and read works of history—the two Romanian historians who influenced him from early on were Bogdan Petriceicu Hasdeu and Nicolae Iorga. His first published work was the 1921 Inamicul viermelui de mătase ("The Silkworm's Enemy"), followed by Cum am găsit piatra filosofală ("How I Found the Philosophers' Stone"). Four years later, Eliade completed work on his debut volume, the autobiographical Novel of the Nearsighted Adolescent.

=== University studies and Indian sojourn ===
Between 1925 and 1928, he attended the University of Bucharest's Faculty of Philosophy and Letters, earning his diploma with a study on Early Modern Italian philosopher Tommaso Campanella. In 1927, Eliade traveled to Italy, where he met Papini and collaborated with the scholar Giuseppe Tucci.

It was during his student years that Eliade met Nae Ionescu, who lectured in Logic, becoming one of his disciples and friends. He was especially attracted to Ionescu's radical ideas and his interest in religion, which signified a break with the rationalist tradition represented by senior academics such as Constantin Rădulescu-Motru, Dimitrie Gusti, and Tudor Vianu (all of whom owed inspiration to the defunct literary society Junimea, albeit in varying degrees).

Eliade's scholarly works began after a long period of study in British India, at the University of Calcutta. Finding that the Maharaja of Kassimbazar sponsored European scholars to study in India, Eliade applied and was granted an allowance for four years, which was later doubled by a Romanian scholarship. In autumn 1928, he sailed for Calcutta to study Sanskrit and philosophy under Surendranath Dasgupta, a Bengali Cambridge alumnus and professor at Calcutta University, the author of a five volume History of Indian Philosophy. Before reaching the Indian subcontinent, Eliade also made a brief visit to Egypt. Once in India, he visited large areas of the region, and spent a short period at a Himalayan ashram.

He studied the basics of Indian philosophy, and, in parallel, learned Sanskrit, Pali and Bengali under Dasgupta's direction. At the time, he also became interested in the actions of Mahatma Gandhi and the Satyagraha as a phenomenon; later, Eliade adapted Gandhian ideas in his discourse on spirituality and Romania.

In 1930, while living with Dasgupta, Eliade fell in love with his host's daughter and the protege of the Indian poet Rabindranath Tagore, Maitreyi Devi, later writing a barely disguised autobiographical novel Maitreyi (also known as "La Nuit Bengali" or "Bengal Nights"), in which he claimed that he carried on a physical relationship with her.

Eliade received his PhD in 1933, with a thesis on Yoga practices. The book, which was translated into French three years later, had significant impact in academia, both in Romania and abroad.

He later recalled that the book was an early step for understanding not just Indian religious practices, but also Romanian spirituality. During the same period, Eliade began a correspondence with the Ceylonese-born philosopher Ananda Coomaraswamy. In 1936–1937, he functioned as honorary assistant for Ionescu's course, lecturing in Metaphysics.

In 1933, Mircea Eliade had a physical relationship with the actress Sorana Țopa, while falling in love with Nina Mareș, whom he ultimately married. The latter, introduced to him by his new friend Mihail Sebastian, already had a daughter, Giza, from a man who had divorced her. Eliade subsequently adopted Giza, and the three of them moved to an apartment at 141 Dacia Boulevard. He left his residence in 1936, during a trip he made to the United Kingdom and Germany, when he first visited London, Oxford, and Berlin.

=== Criterion and Cuvântul ===
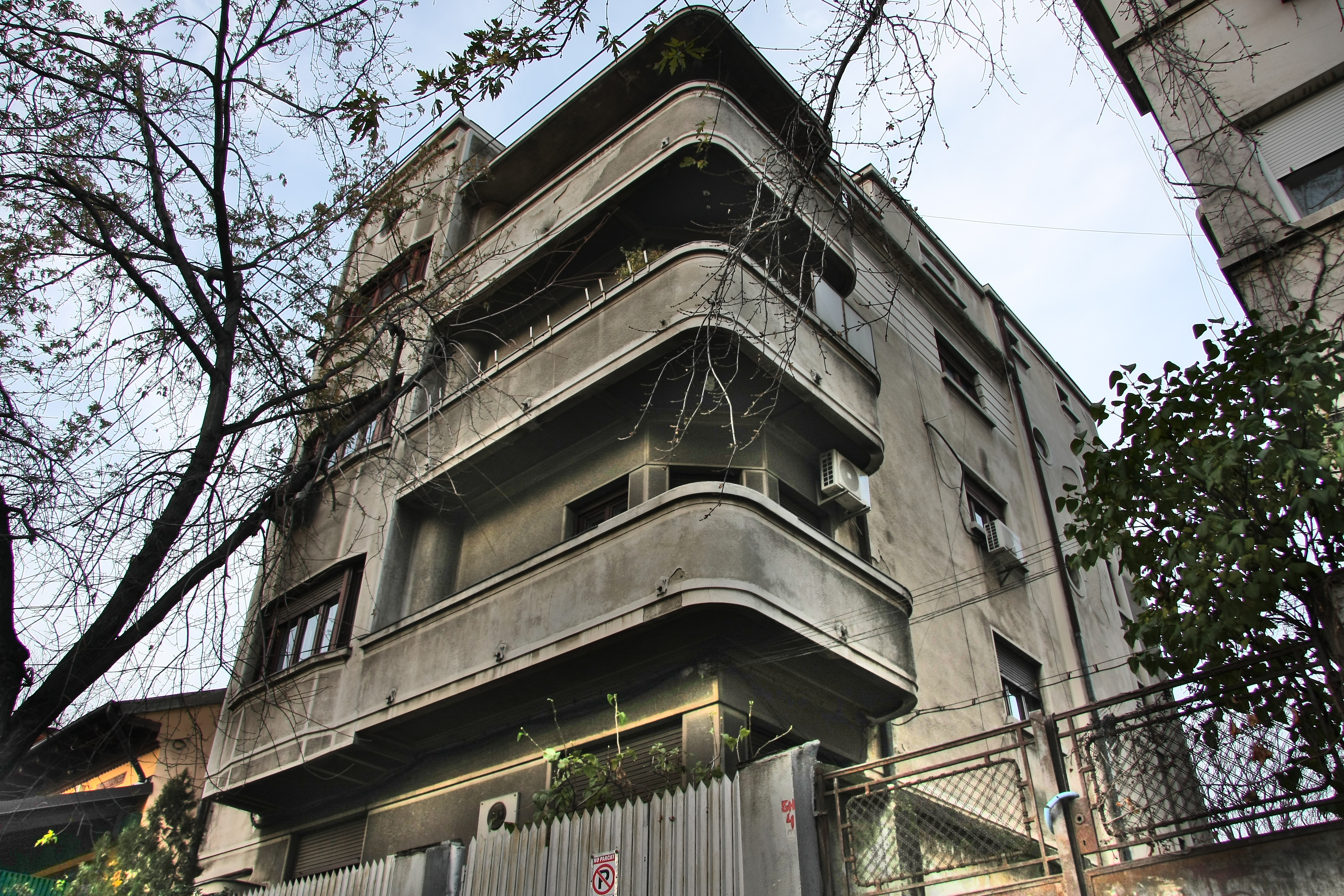
Eliade's home in Bucharest (1934–1940)

After contributing various and generally polemical pieces in university magazines, Eliade came to the attention of journalist Pamfil Șeicaru, who invited him to collaborate on the nationalist paper Cuvântul, which was noted for its harsh tones. By then, Cuvântul was also hosting articles by Nae Ionescu.

As one of the figures in the Criterion literary society (1933–1934), Eliade's initial encounter with the traditional far right was polemical: the group's conferences were stormed by members of A. C. Cuza's National-Christian Defense League, who objected to what they viewed as pacifism and addressed antisemitic insults to several speakers, including Sebastian; in 1933, he was among the signers of a manifesto opposing Nazi Germany's state-enforced racism.

In 1934, at a time when Sebastian was publicly insulted by Nae Ionescu, who prefaced his book (De două mii de ani...) with thoughts on the "eternal damnation" of Jews, Mircea Eliade spoke out against this perspective, and commented that Ionescu's references to the verdict "Outside the Church there is no salvation" contradicted the notion of God's omnipotence. However, he contended that Ionescu's text was not evidence of antisemitism.

In 1936, reflecting on the early history of the Romanian Kingdom and its Jewish community, he deplored the expulsion of Jewish scholars from Romania, making specific references to Moses Gaster, Heimann Hariton Tiktin and Lazăr Șăineanu. Eliade's views at the time focused on innovation—in the summer of 1933, he replied to an anti-modernist critique written by George Călinescu:

All I wish for is a deep change, a complete transformation. But, for God's sake, in any direction other than spirituality.

He and friends Emil Cioran and Constantin Noica were by then under the influence of Trăirism, a school of thought that was formed around the ideals expressed by Ionescu. A form of existentialism, Trăirism was also the synthesis of traditional and newer right-wing beliefs. Early on, a public polemic was sparked between Eliade and Camil Petrescu: the two eventually reconciled and later became good friends.

Like Mihail Sebastian, who was himself becoming influenced by Ionescu, he maintained contacts with intellectuals from all sides of the political spectrum: their entourage included the right-wing Dan Botta and Mircea Vulcănescu, the non-political Petrescu and Ionel Jianu, and Belu Zilber, who was a member of the illegal Romanian Communist Party.

The group also included Haig Acterian, Mihail Polihroniade, Petru Comarnescu, Marietta Sadova and Floria Capsali.

He was also close to Marcel Avramescu, a former Surrealist writer whom he introduced to the works of René Guénon. A doctor in the Kabbalah and future Romanian Orthodox cleric, Avramescu joined Eliade in editing the short-lived esoteric magazine Memra (the only one of its kind in Romania).

Among the intellectuals who attended his lectures were Mihai Şora (whom he deemed his favorite student), Eugen Schileru and Miron Constantinescu—known later as, respectively, a philosopher, an art critic, and a sociologist and political figure of the communist regime. Mariana Klein, who became Șora's wife, was one of Eliade's female students, and later authored works on his scholarship.

Eliade later recounted that he had himself enlisted Zilber as a Cuvântul contributor, for him to provide a Marxist perspective on the issues discussed by the journal. Their relationship soured in 1935, when the latter publicly accused Eliade of serving as an agent for the secret police, Siguranța Statului (Sebastian answered to the statement by alleging that Zilber was himself a secret agent, and the latter eventually retracted his claim).

=== 1930s political transition ===
Eliade's articles before and after his adherence to the principles of the Iron Guard (or, as it was usually known at the time, the Legionary Movement), beginning with his Itinerar spiritual ("Spiritual Itinerary", serialized in Cuvântul in 1927), center on several political ideals advocated by the far right.

They displayed his rejection of liberalism and the modernizing goals of the 1848 Wallachian revolution (perceived as "an abstract apology of Mankind" and "ape-like imitation of [Western] Europe"), as well as for democracy itself (accusing it of "managing to crush all attempts at national renaissance", and later praising Benito Mussolini's Fascist Italy on the grounds that, according to Eliade, "[in Italy,] he who thinks for himself is promoted to the highest office in the shortest of times"). He approved of an ethnic nationalist state centered on the Orthodox Church (in 1927, despite his still-vivid interest in Theosophy, he recommended young intellectuals "the return to the Church"), which he opposed to, among others, the secular nationalism of Constantin Rădulescu-Motru; referring to this particular ideal as "Romanianism", Eliade was, in 1934, still viewing it as "neither fascism, nor chauvinism".

Eliade was especially dissatisfied with the incidence of unemployment among intellectuals, whose careers in state-financed institutions had been rendered uncertain by the Great Depression.

In 1936, Eliade was the focus of a campaign in the far right press, being targeted for having authored "pornography" in his Domnișoara Christina and Isabel și apele diavolului; similar accusations were aimed at other cultural figures, including Tudor Arghezi and Geo Bogza. Assessments of Eliade's work were in sharp contrast to one another: also in 1936, Eliade accepted an award from the Romanian Writers' Society, of which he had been a member since 1934. In summer 1937, through an official decision which came as a result of the accusations, and despite student protests, he was stripped of his position at the university.

Eliade decided to sue the Ministry of Education, asking for a symbolic compensation of 1 leu. He won the trial, and regained his position as Nae Ionescu's assistant.

Nevertheless, by 1937, he gave his intellectual support to the Iron Guard, in which he saw "a Christian revolution aimed at creating a new Romania", and a group able "to reconcile Romania with God". His articles of the time, published in Iron Guard-affiliated papers such as Sfarmă-Piatră and Buna Vestire, contain ample praises of the movement's leaders (Corneliu Zelea Codreanu, Ion Moța, Vasile Marin, and Gheorghe Cantacuzino-Grănicerul). The transition he went through was similar to that of his fellow generation members and close collaborators—among the notable exceptions to this rule were Petru Comarnescu, sociologist Henri H. Stahl and future dramatist Eugène Ionesco, as well as Sebastian.

He eventually enrolled in the Totul pentru Țară ("Everything for the Fatherland" Party), the political expression of the Iron Guard, and contributed to its 1937 electoral campaign in Prahova County—as indicated by his inclusion on a list of party members with county-level responsibilities (published in Buna Vestire).

=== Internment and diplomatic service ===
The stance taken by Eliade resulted in his arrest on July 14, 1938, after a crackdown on the Iron Guard authorized by King Carol II. At the time of his arrest, he had just interrupted a column on Provincia și legionarismul ("The Province and Legionary Ideology") in Vremea, having been singled out by Prime Minister Armand Călinescu as an author of Iron Guard propaganda.

Eliade was kept for three weeks in a cell at the Siguranța Statului Headquarters, in an attempt to have him sign a "declaration of dissociation" with the Iron Guard, but he refused to do so. In the first week of August he was transferred to a makeshift camp at Miercurea-Ciuc. When Eliade began coughing blood in October 1938, he was taken to a clinic in Moroeni. Eliade was simply released on November 12, and subsequently spent his time writing his play Iphigenia (also known as Ifigenia). In April 1940, with the help of Alexandru Rosetti, he became Cultural Attaché to the United Kingdom, a posting cut short when Romanian-British foreign relations were broken.

After leaving London he was assigned the office of Counsel and Press Officer (later Cultural Attaché) to the Romanian Embassy in Portugal, where he was kept on as diplomat by the National Legionary State (the Iron Guard government) and, ultimately, by Ion Antonescu's regime. His office involved disseminating propaganda in favor of the Romanian state. In 1941, during his time in Portugal, Eliade stayed in Estoril, at the Hotel Palácio. He would later find a house in Cascais, at Rua da Saudade.

In February 1941, weeks after the bloody Legionary Rebellion was crushed by Antonescu, Iphigenia was staged by the National Theatre Bucharest—the play soon raised concerns that it owed inspiration to the Iron Guard's ideology, and even that its inclusion in the program was a Legionary attempt at subversion.

In 1942, Eliade authored a volume in praise of the Estado Novo, established in Portugal by António de Oliveira Salazar, claiming that "The Salazarian state, a Christian and totalitarian one, is first and foremost based on love". On July 7 of the same year, he was received by Salazar himself, who assigned Eliade the task of warning Antonescu to withdraw the Romanian Army from the Eastern Front ("[In his place], I would not be grinding it in Russia"). Eliade also claimed that such contacts with the leader of a neutral country had made him the target for Gestapo surveillance, but that he had managed to communicate Salazar's advice to Mihai Antonescu, Romania's Foreign Minister.

In autumn 1943, he traveled to occupied France, where he rejoined Emil Cioran, also meeting with scholar Georges Dumézil and the collaborationist writer Paul Morand. At the same time, he applied for a position of lecturer at the University of Bucharest, but withdrew from the race, leaving Constantin Noica and Ion Zamfirescu to dispute the position, in front of a panel of academics comprising Lucian Blaga and Dimitrie Gusti (Zamfirescu's eventual selection, going against Blaga's recommendation, was to be the topic of a controversy). In his private notes, Eliade wrote that he took no further interest in the office, because his visits abroad had convinced him that he had "something great to say", and that he could not function within the confines of "a minor culture". Also during the war, Eliade traveled to Berlin, where he met and conversed with controversial political theorist Carl Schmitt, and frequently visited Francoist Spain, where he notably attended the 1944 Lusitano-Spanish scientific congress in Córdoba. It was during his trips to Spain that Eliade met philosophers José Ortega y Gasset and Eugenio d'Ors. He maintained a friendship with d'Ors, and met him again on several occasions after the war.

Nina Eliade fell ill with uterine cancer and died during their stay in Lisbon, in late 1944. As the widower later wrote, the disease was probably caused by an abortion procedure she had undergone at an early stage of their relationship. He came to suffer from clinical depression, which increased as Romania and her Axis allies suffered major defeats on the Eastern Front. Contemplating a return to Romania as a soldier or a monk, he was on a continuous search for effective antidepressants, medicating himself with passion flower extract, and, eventually, with methamphetamine. This was probably not his first experience with drugs: vague mentions in his notebooks have been read as indication that Mircea Eliade was taking opium during his travels to Calcutta. Later, discussing the works of Aldous Huxley, Eliade wrote that the British author's use of mescaline as a source of inspiration had something in common with his own experience, indicating 1945 as a date of reference and adding that it was "needless to explain why that is".

=== Early exile ===
At signs that the Romanian communist regime was about to take hold, Eliade opted not to return to the country. On September 16, 1945, he moved to France with his adopted daughter Giza. Once there, he resumed contacts with Dumézil, who helped him recover his position in academia. On Dumézil's recommendation, he taught at the École Pratique des Hautes Études in Paris. It was estimated that, at the time, it was not uncommon for him to work 15 hours a day. Eliade married a second time, to the Romanian exile Christinel Cotescu. His second wife, the descendant of boyars, was the sister-in-law of the conductor Ionel Perlea.

Together with Emil Cioran and other Romanian expatriates, Eliade rallied with the former diplomat Alexandru Busuioceanu, helping him publicize anti-communist opinion to the Western European public. He was also briefly involved in publishing a Romanian-language magazine, titled Luceafărul ("The Morning Star"), and was again in contact with Mihai Șora, who had been granted a scholarship to study in France, and with Șora's wife Mariana. In 1947, he was facing material constraints, and Ananda Coomaraswamy found him a job as a French-language teacher in the United States, at a school in Arizona; the arrangement ended upon Coomaraswamy's death in September.

Beginning in 1948, he wrote for the journal Critique, edited by French philosopher Georges Bataille. The following year, he went on a visit to Italy, where he wrote the first 300 pages of his novel Noaptea de Sânziene (he visited the country a third time in 1952). He collaborated with Carl Jung and the Eranos circle after Henry Corbin recommended him in 1949, and wrote for the Antaios magazine (edited by Ernst Jünger). In 1950, Eliade began attending Eranos conferences, meeting Jung, Olga Fröbe-Kapteyn, Gershom Scholem and Paul Radin. He described Eranos as "one of the most creative cultural experiences of the modern Western world."

In October 1956, he moved to the United States, settling in Chicago the following year. He had been invited by Joachim Wach to give a series of lectures at Wach's home institution, the University of Chicago. Eliade and Wach are generally admitted to be the founders of the "Chicago school" that basically defined the study of religions for the second half of the 20th century. Upon Wach's death before the lectures were delivered, Eliade was appointed as his successor, becoming, in 1964, the Sewell Avery Distinguished Service Professor of the History of Religions. Beginning in 1954, with the first edition of his volume on Eternal Return, Eliade also enjoyed commercial success: the book went through several editions under different titles, and sold over 100,000 copies.

In 1966, Mircea Eliade became a member of the American Academy of Arts and Sciences. He also worked as editor-in-chief of Macmillan Publishers' Encyclopedia of Religion, and, in 1968, lectured in religious history at the University of California, Santa Barbara. It was also during that period that Mircea Eliade completed his voluminous and influential History of Religious Ideas, which grouped together the overviews of his main original interpretations of religious history. He occasionally traveled out of the United States, attending the Congress for the History of Religions in Marburg (1960), and visiting Sweden and Norway in 1970.

=== Final years and death ===
Initially, Eliade was attacked with virulence by the Romanian Communist Party press, chiefly by România Liberă—which described him as "the Iron Guard's ideologue, enemy of the working class, apologist of Salazar's dictatorship". However, the regime also made secretive attempts to enlist his and Cioran's support: Haig Acterian's widow, theater director Marietta Sadova, was sent to Paris to re-establish contacts with the two. Although the move was planned by Romanian officials, her encounters were to be used as evidence incriminating her at a February 1960 trial for treason (where Constantin Noica and Dinu Pillat were the main defendants). Romania's secret police, the Securitate, also portrayed Eliade as a spy for the British Secret Intelligence Service and a former agent of the Gestapo.

He was slowly rehabilitated at home beginning in the early 1960s, under the rule of Gheorghe Gheorghiu-Dej. In the 1970s, Eliade was approached by the Nicolae Ceaușescu regime in several ways, to have him return. The move was prompted by the officially sanctioned nationalism and Romania's claim to independence from the Eastern Bloc, as both phenomena came to see Eliade's prestige as an asset. An unprecedented event occurred with the interview that was granted by Mircea Eliade to poet Adrian Păunescu, during the latter's 1970 visit to Chicago; Eliade complimented both Păunescu's activism and his support for official tenets, expressing a belief that

the youth of Eastern Europe is clearly superior to that of Western Europe. [...] I am convinced that, within ten years, the young revolutionary generation shan't be behaving as does today the noisy minority of Western contesters. [...] Eastern youth have seen the abolition of traditional institutions, have accepted it [...] and are not yet content with the structures enforced, but rather seek to improve them.

Păunescu's visit to Chicago was followed by those of the nationalist official writer Eugen Barbu and by Eliade's friend Constantin Noica (who had since been released from jail). At the time, Eliade contemplated returning to Romania, but was eventually persuaded by fellow Romanian intellectuals in exile (including Radio Free Europe's Virgil Ierunca and Monica Lovinescu) to reject Communist proposals. In 1977, he joined other exiled Romanian intellectuals in signing a telegram protesting the repressive measures newly enforced by the Ceaușescu regime. Writing in 2007, Romanian anthropologist Andrei Oișteanu recounted how, around 1984, the Securitate unsuccessfully attempted to become an agent of influence in Eliade's Chicago circle.

During his later years, Eliade's past was progressively exposed publicly, the stress of which probably contributed to the decline of his health. By then, his writing career was hampered by severe arthritis. The last academic honors bestowed upon him were the French Academy's Bordin Prize (1977) and the title of Doctor Honoris Causa, granted by George Washington University (1985).

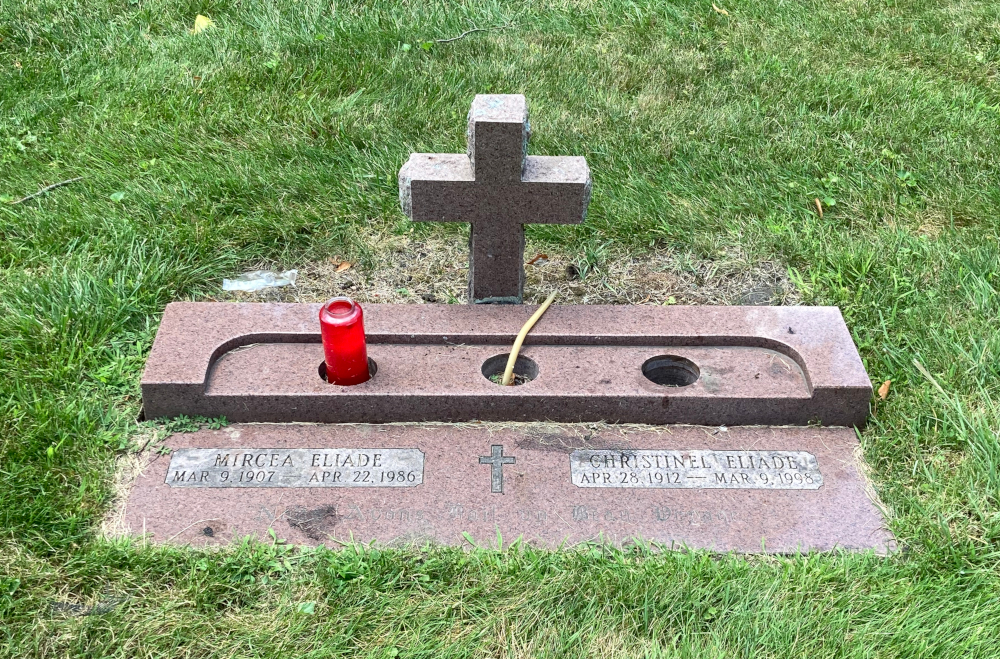
Eliade's grave at Oak Woods Cemetery

Mircea Eliade died at the Bernard Mitchell Hospital in April 1986. Eight days previously, he suffered a stroke while reading Emil Cioran's Exercises of Admiration, and had subsequently lost his speech function. Four months before, a fire had destroyed part of his office at the Meadville Lombard Theological School (an event which he had interpreted as an omen). Eliade's Romanian disciple Ioan Petru Culianu, who recalled the scientific community's reaction to the news, described Eliade's death as "a mahaparanirvana", thus comparing it to the passing of Gautama Buddha. His body was cremated in Chicago, and the funeral ceremony was held on University grounds, at the Rockefeller Chapel. It was attended by 1,200 people, and included a public reading of Eliade's text in which he recalled the epiphany of his childhood—the lecture was given by novelist Saul Bellow, Eliade's colleague at the university. His student and the bearer of his legacy, Charles H. Long, co-founder of the History of Religions at the University of Chicago Divinity School, gave the eulogy. His grave is located in Oak Woods Cemetery.

== Work ==
=== The general nature of religion ===
In his work on the history of religion, Eliade is most highly regarded for his writings on Alchemy, Shamanism, Yoga and what he called the eternal return—the implicit belief, supposedly present in religious thought in general, that religious behavior is not only an imitation of, but also a participation in, sacred events, and thus restores the mythical time of origins. Eliade's thinking was in part influenced by Rudolf Otto, Gerardus van der Leeuw, Nae Ionescu and the writings of the Traditionalist School (René Guénon and Julius Evola). For instance, Eliade's The Sacred and the Profane partially builds on Otto's The Idea of the Holy to show how religion emerges from the experience of the sacred, and myths of time and nature.

Eliade is known for his attempt to find broad, cross-cultural parallels and unities in religion, particularly in myths. Wendy Doniger, Eliade's colleague from 1978 until his death, has observed that "Eliade argued boldly for universals where he might more safely have argued for widely prevalent patterns." His Treatise on the History of Religions was praised by French philologist Georges Dumézil for its coherence and ability to synthesize diverse and distinct mythologies.

Robert Ellwood describes Eliade's approach to religion as follows. Eliade approaches religion by imagining an ideally "religious" person, whom he calls homo religiosus in his writings. Eliade's theories basically describe how this homo religiosus would view the world. This does not mean that all religious practitioners actually think and act like homo religiosus. Instead, it means that religious behavior "says through its own language" that the world is as homo religiosus would see it, whether or not the real-life participants in religious behavior are aware of it. However, Ellwood writes that Eliade "tends to slide over that last qualification", implying that traditional societies actually thought like homo religiosus.

==== Sacred and profane ====
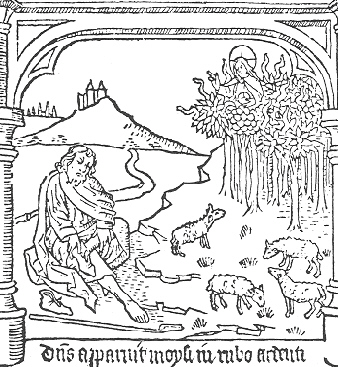
Moses taking off his shoes in front of the burning bush (illustration from a 16th-century edition of the Speculum Humanae Salvationis)

Eliade argues that "Yahweh is both kind and wrathful; the God of the Christian mystics and theologians is terrible and gentle at once." He also thought that the Indian and Chinese mystic tried to attain "a state of perfect indifference and neutrality" that resulted in a coincidence of opposites in which "pleasure and pain, desire and repulsion, cold and heat [...] are expunged from his awareness."

Eliade's understanding of religion centers on his concept of hierophany (manifestation of the Sacred)—a concept that includes, but is not limited to, the older and more restrictive concept of theophany (manifestation of a god). From the perspective of religious thought, Eliade argues, hierophanies give structure and orientation to the world, establishing a sacred order. The "profane" space of nonreligious experience can only be divided up geometrically: it has no "qualitative differentiation and, hence, no orientation [is] given by virtue of its inherent structure." Thus, profane space gives man no pattern for his behavior. In contrast to profane space, the site of a hierophany has a sacred structure to which religious man conforms himself. A hierophany amounts to a "revelation of an absolute reality, opposed to the non-reality of the vast surrounding expanse." As an example of "sacred space" demanding a certain response from man, Eliade gives the story of Moses halting before Yahweh's manifestation as a burning bush (Exodus 3:5) and taking off his shoes.

==== Origin myths and sacred time ====
Eliade notes that, in traditional societies, myth represents the absolute truth about primordial time. According to the myths, this was the time when the Sacred first appeared, establishing the world's structure—myths claim to describe the primordial events that made society and the natural world be that which they are. Eliade argues that all myths are, in that sense, origin myths: "myth, then, is always an account of a 'creation.'"

Many traditional societies believe that the power of a thing lies in its origin. If origin is equivalent to power, then "it is the first manifestation of a thing that is significant and valid" (a thing's reality and value therefore lies only in its first appearance).

According to Eliade's theory, only the Sacred has value, only a thing's first appearance has value and, therefore, only the Sacred's first appearance has value. Myth describes the Sacred's first appearance; therefore, the mythical age is sacred time, the only time of value: "primitive man was interested only in the beginnings [...] to him it mattered little what had happened to himself, or to others like him, in more or less distant times." Eliade postulated this as the reason for the "nostalgia for origins" that appears in many religions, the desire to return to a primordial Paradise.

==== Eternal return and "Terror of history" ====
Eliade argues that traditional man attributes no value to the linear march of historical events: only the events of the mythical age have value. To give his own life value, traditional man performs myths and rituals. Because the Sacred's essence lies only in the mythical age, only in the Sacred's first appearance, any later appearance is actually the first appearance; by recounting or re-enacting mythical events, myths and rituals "re-actualize" those events. Eliade often uses the term "archetypes" to refer to the mythical models established by the Sacred, although Eliade's use of the term should be distinguished from the use of the term in Jungian psychology.

Thus, argues Eliade, religious behavior does not only commemorate, but also participates in, sacred events:

In imitating the exemplary acts of a god or of a mythical hero, or simply by recounting their adventures, the man of an archaic society detaches himself from profane time and magically re-enters the Great Time, the sacred time.

Eliade called this concept the "eternal return" (distinguished from the philosophical concept of "eternal return"). Wendy Doniger noted that Eliade's theory of the eternal return "has become a truism in the study of religions."

Eliade attributes the well-known "cyclic" vision of time in ancient thought to belief in the eternal return. For instance, the New Year ceremonies among the Mesopotamians, the Egyptians, and other Near Eastern peoples re-enacted their cosmogonic myths. Therefore, by the logic of the eternal return, each New Year ceremony was the beginning of the world for these peoples. According to Eliade, these peoples felt a need to return to the Beginning at regular intervals, turning time into a circle.

Eliade argues that yearning to remain in the mythical age causes a "terror of history": traditional man desires to escape the linear succession of events (which, Eliade indicated, he viewed as empty of any inherent value or sacrality). Eliade suggests that the abandonment of mythical thought and the full acceptance of linear, historical time, with its "terror", is one of the reasons for modern man's anxieties. Traditional societies escape this anxiety to an extent, as they refuse to completely acknowledge historical time. But the return to the sources involved an apocalyptic experience. Doina Ruști, analyzing the story The Old Man and The Bureaucrats (Pe strada Mântuleasa), says The memories create the chaos, because "the myth makes irruption in a world in tormented birth, without memory, and transform all in a labyrinth".

==== Coincidentia oppositorum ====
Eliade claims that many myths, rituals, and mystical experiences involve a "coincidence of opposites", or coincidentia oppositorum. In fact, he calls the coincidentia oppositorum "the mythical pattern." Many myths, Eliade notes, "present us with a twofold revelation":

they express on the one hand the diametrical opposition of two divine figures sprung from one and the same principle and destined, in many versions, to be reconciled at some illud tempus of eschatology, and on the other, the coincidentia oppositorum in the very nature of the divinity, which shows itself, by turns or even simultaneously, benevolent and terrible, creative and destructive, solar and serpentine, and so on (in other words, actual and potential).

The reconciling opposites "involves imitating gestures or situations from before the establishment of history, by recovering the initial state, by regenerating time and the world, but also by mystical initiation."

Eliade argues that "Yahweh is both kind and wrathful; the God of the Christian mystics and theologians is terrible and gentle at once." He also thought that the Indian and Chinese mystic tried to attain "a state of perfect indifference and neutrality" that resulted in a coincidence of opposites in which "pleasure and pain, desire and repulsion, cold and heat [...] are expunged from his awareness".

According to Eliade, the coincidentia oppositorum's appeal lies in "man's deep dissatisfaction with his actual situation, with what is called the human condition". In many mythologies, the end of the mythical age involves a "fall", a fundamental "ontological change in the structure of the World". Because the coincidentia oppositorum is a contradiction, it represents a denial of the world's current logical structure, a reversal of the "fall".

Also, traditional man's dissatisfaction with the post-mythical age expresses itself as a feeling of being "torn and separate". In many mythologies, the lost mythical age was a Paradise, "a paradoxical state in which the contraries exist side by side without conflict, and the multiplications form aspects of a mysterious Unity". The coincidentia oppositorum expresses a wish to recover the lost unity of the mythical Paradise, for it presents a reconciliation of opposites and the unification of diversity:

On the level of pre-systematic thought, the mystery of totality embodies man's endeavor to reach a perspective in which the contraries are abolished, the Spirit of Evil reveals itself as a stimulant of Good, and Demons appear as the night aspect of the Gods.

=== Exceptions to the general nature ===
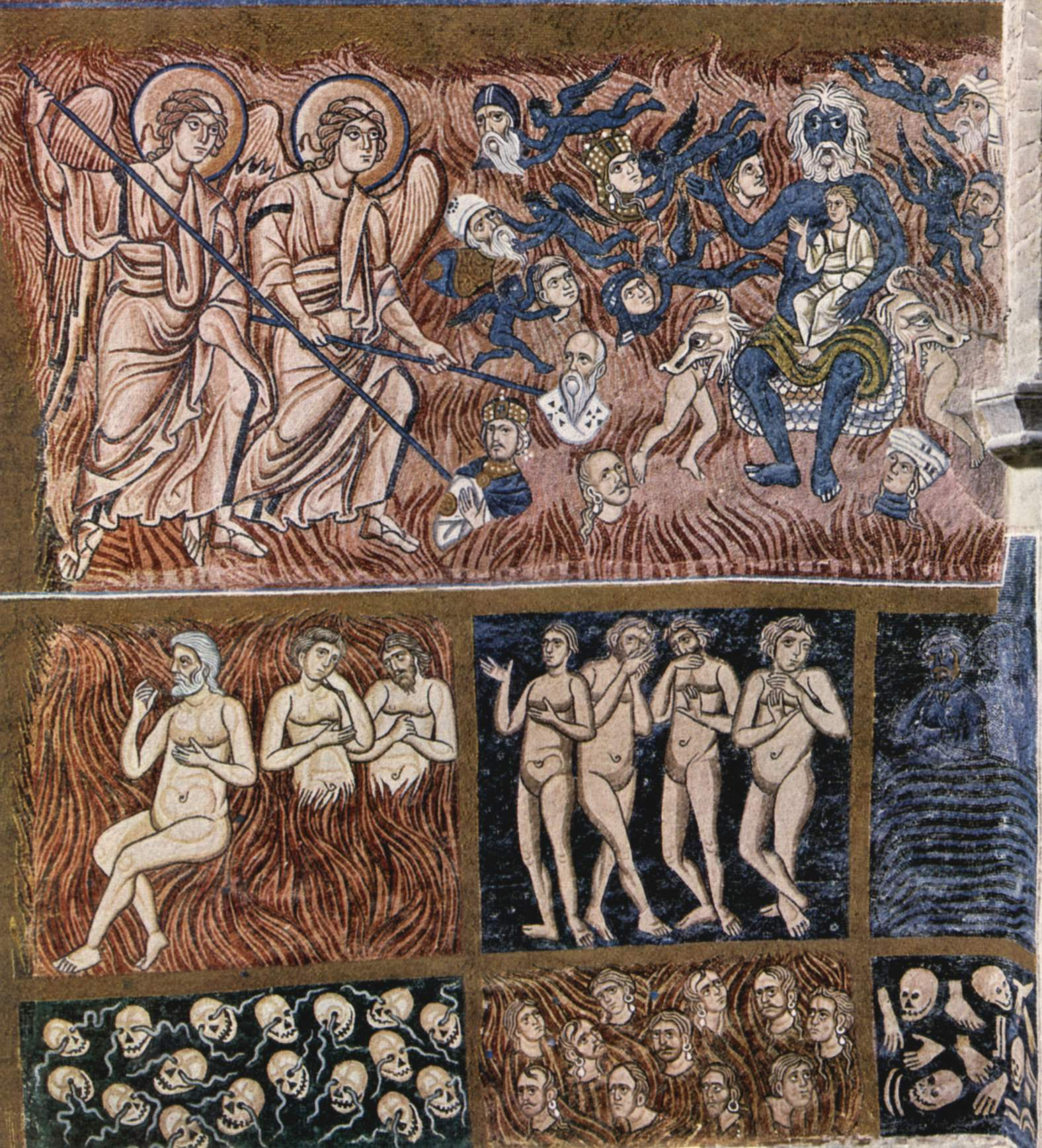
The Last Judgment (detail) in the 12th century Byzantine mosaic at Torcello

Eliade acknowledges that not all religious behavior has all the attributes described in his theory of sacred time and the eternal return. The Zoroastrian, Jewish, Christian, and Muslim traditions embrace linear, historical time as sacred or capable of sanctification, while some Eastern traditions largely reject the notion of sacred time, seeking escape from the cycles of time.

Because they contain rituals, Judaism and Christianity necessarily—Eliade argues—retain a sense of cyclic time:

by the very fact that it is a religion, Christianity had to keep at least one mythical aspect—liturgical time, that is, the periodic rediscovery of the illud tempus of the beginnings [and] an imitation of the Christ as exemplary pattern.

However, Judaism and Christianity do not see time as a circle endlessly turning on itself; nor do they see such a cycle as desirable, as a way to participate in the Sacred. Instead, these religions embrace the concept of linear history progressing toward the Messianic Age or the Last Judgment, thus initiating the idea of "progress" (humans are to work for a Paradise in the future). However, Eliade's understanding of Judaeo-Christian eschatology can also be understood as cyclical in that the "end of time" is a return to God: "The final catastrophe will put an end to history, hence will restore man to eternity and beatitude."

The pre-Islamic Persian religion of Zoroastrianism, which made a notable "contribution to the religious formation of the West", also has a linear sense of time; although, according to Eliade, the Hebrews' linear sense of time predates their being influenced by Zoroastrianism. In fact, Eliade identifies the Hebrews, not the Zoroastrians, as the first culture to truly "valorize" historical time, the first to see all major historical events as episodes in a continuous divine revelation. However, Eliade argues, Judaism elaborated its mythology of linear time by adding elements borrowed from Zoroastrianism—including ethical dualism, a savior figure, the future resurrection of the body, and the idea of cosmic progress toward "the final triumph of Good."

The Indian religions of the East generally retain a cyclic view of time—for instance, the Hindu doctrine of kalpas. According to Eliade, most religions that accept the cyclic view of time also embrace it: they see it as a way to return to the sacred time. However, in Buddhism, Jainism, and some forms of Hinduism, the Sacred lies outside the flux of the material world (called maya, or "illusion"), and one can only reach it by escaping from the cycles of time. Because the Sacred lies outside cyclic time, which conditions humans, people can only reach the Sacred by escaping the human condition. According to Eliade, Yoga techniques aim at escaping the limitations of the body, allowing the soul (atman) to rise above maya and reach the Sacred (nirvana, moksha). Imagery of "freedom", and of death to one's old body and rebirth with a new body, occur frequently in Yogic texts, representing escape from the bondage of the temporal human condition. Eliade discusses these themes in detail in Yoga: Immortality and Freedom.

=== Symbolism of the Center ===
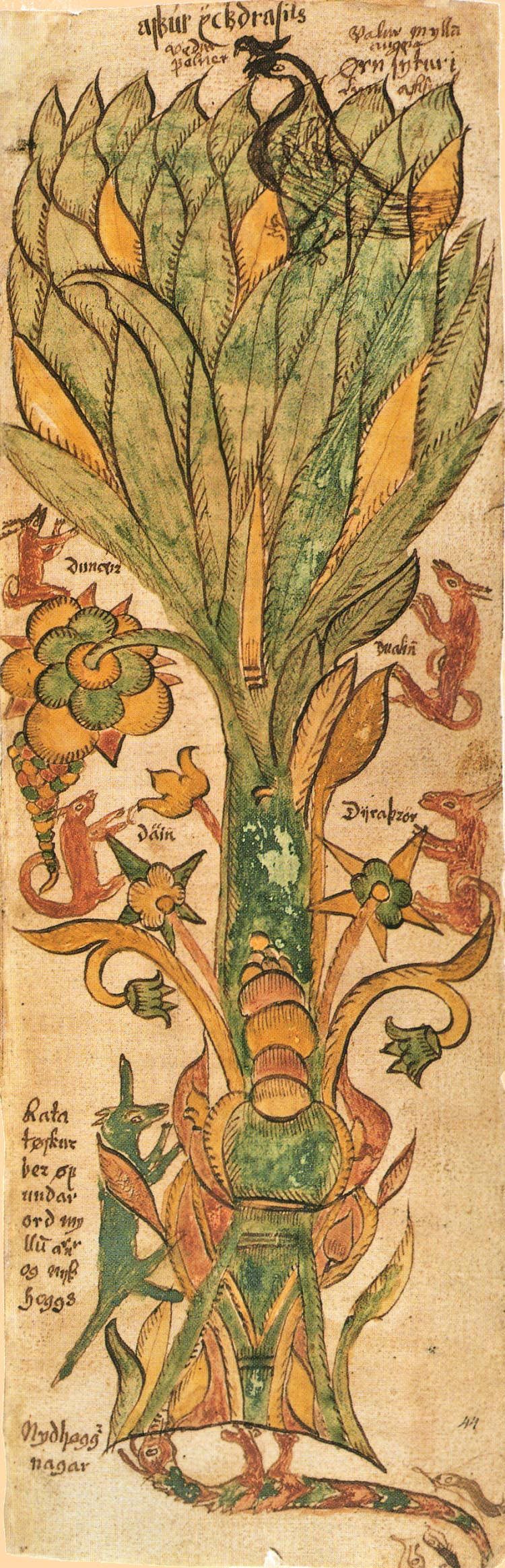
The Cosmic Tree Yggdrasill, as depicted in a 17th-century Icelandic miniature

A recurrent theme in Eliade's myth analysis is the axis mundi, the Center of the World. According to Eliade, the Cosmic Center is a necessary corollary to the division of reality into the Sacred and the profane. The Sacred contains all value, and the world gains purpose and meaning only through hierophanies:

In the homogeneous and infinite expanse, in which no point of reference is possible and hence no orientation is established, the hierophany reveals an absolute fixed point, a center.

Because profane space gives man no orientation for his life, the Sacred must manifest itself in a hierophany, thereby establishing a sacred site around which man can orient himself. The site of a hierophany establishes a "fixed point, a center". This Center abolishes the "homogeneity and relativity of profane space", for it becomes "the central axis for all future orientation".

A manifestation of the Sacred in profane space is, by definition, an example of something breaking through from one plane of existence to another. Therefore, the initial hierophany that establishes the Center must be a point at which there is contact between different planes—this, Eliade argues, explains the frequent mythical imagery of a Cosmic Tree or Pillar joining Heaven, Earth, and the underworld.

Eliade noted that, when traditional societies found a new territory, they often perform consecrating rituals that reenact the hierophany that established the center and founded the world. In addition, the designs of traditional buildings, especially temples, usually imitate the mythical image of the axis mundi joining the different cosmic levels. For instance, the Babylonian ziggurats were built to resemble cosmic mountains passing through the heavenly spheres, and the rock of the Temple in Jerusalem was supposed to reach deep into the tehom, or primordial waters.

According to the logic of the eternal return, the site of each such symbolic Center will actually be the Center of the World:

It may be said, in general, that the majority of the sacred and ritual trees that we meet with in the history of religions are only replicas, imperfect copies of this exemplary archetype, the Cosmic Tree. Thus, all these sacred trees are thought of as situated at the Centre of the World, and all the ritual trees or posts [...] are, as it were, magically projected into the Centre of the World.

According to Eliade's interpretation, religious man apparently feels the need to live not only near, but at, the mythical Center as much as possible, given that the center is the point of communication with the Sacred.

Thus, Eliade argues, many traditional societies share common outlines in their mythical geographies. In the middle of the known world is the sacred Center, "a place that is sacred above all"; this Center anchors the established order. Around the sacred Center lies the known world, the realm of established order; and beyond the known world is a chaotic and dangerous realm, "peopled by ghosts, demons, [and] 'foreigners' (who are [identified with] demons and the souls of the dead)". According to Eliade, traditional societies place their known world at the Center because (from their perspective) their known world is the realm that obeys a recognizable order, and it therefore must be the realm in which the Sacred manifests itself; the regions beyond the known world, which seem strange and foreign, must lie far from the center, outside the order established by the Sacred.

=== The High God ===
According to some "evolutionistic" theories of religion, especially that of Edward Burnett Tylor, cultures naturally progress from animism and polytheism to monotheism. According to this view, more advanced cultures should be more monotheistic, and more primitive cultures should be more polytheistic. However, many of the most "primitive", pre-agricultural societies believe in a supreme sky-god. Thus, according to Eliade, post-19th-century scholars have rejected Tylor's theory of evolution from animism. Based on the discovery of supreme sky-gods among "primitives", Eliade suspects that the earliest humans worshiped a heavenly Supreme Being. In Patterns in Comparative Religion, he writes, "The most popular prayer in the world is addressed to 'Our Father who art in heaven.' It is possible that man's earliest prayers were addressed to the same heavenly father."

However, Eliade disagrees with Wilhelm Schmidt, who thought the earliest form of religion was a strict monotheism. Eliade dismisses this theory of "primordial monotheism" (Urmonotheismus) as "rigid" and unworkable. "At most," he writes, "this schema [Schmidt's theory] renders an account of human [religious] evolution since the Paleolithic era". If an Urmonotheismus did exist, Eliade adds, it probably differed in many ways from the conceptions of God in many modern monotheistic faiths: for instance, the primordial High God could manifest himself as an animal without losing his status as a celestial Supreme Being.

According to Eliade, heavenly Supreme Beings are actually less common in more advanced cultures. Eliade speculates that the discovery of agriculture brought a host of fertility gods and goddesses into the forefront, causing the celestial Supreme Being to fade away and eventually vanish from many ancient religions. Even in primitive hunter-gatherer societies, the High God is a vague, distant figure, dwelling high above the world. Often he has no cult and receives prayer only as a last resort, when all else has failed. Eliade calls the distant High God a deus otiosus ("idle god").

In belief systems that involve a deus otiosus, the distant High God is believed to have been closer to humans during the mythical age. After finishing his works of creation, the High God "forsook the earth and withdrew into the highest heaven". This is an example of the Sacred's distance from "profane" life, life lived after the mythical age: by escaping from the profane condition through religious behavior, figures such as the shaman return to the conditions of the mythical age, which include nearness to the High God ("by his flight or ascension, the shaman [...] meets the God of Heaven face to face and speaks directly to him, as man sometimes did in illo tempore"). The shamanistic behaviors surrounding the High God are a particularly clear example of the eternal return.

=== Shamanism ===
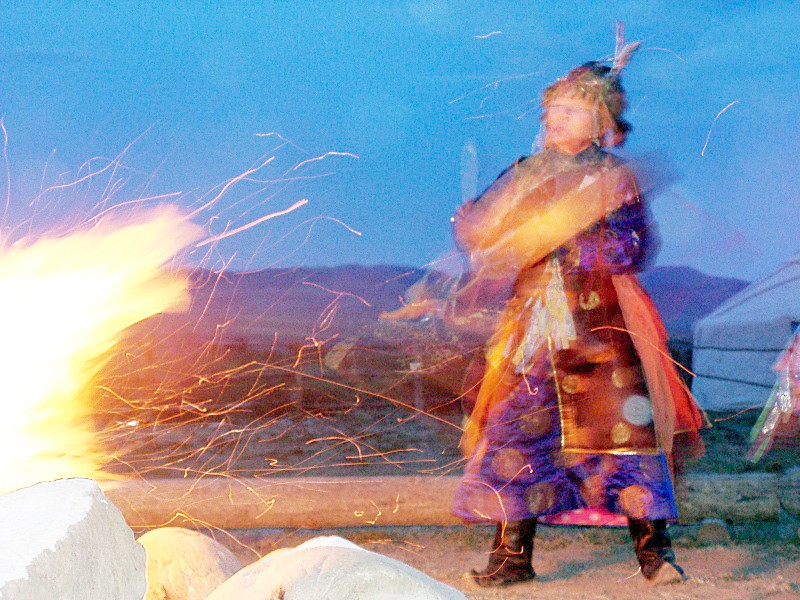
A shaman performing a ceremonial in Tuva

Eliade's scholarly work includes a study of shamanism, Shamanism: Archaic Techniques of Ecstasy, a survey of shamanistic practices in different areas. His Myths, Dreams and Mysteries also addresses shamanism in some detail.

In Shamanism, Eliade argues for a restrictive use of the word shaman: it should not apply to just any magician or medicine man, as that would make the term redundant; at the same time, he argues against restricting the term to the practitioners of the sacred of Siberia and Central Asia (it is from one of the titles for this function, namely, šamán, considered by Eliade to be of Tungusic origin, that the term itself was introduced into Western languages). Eliade defines a shaman as follows:

he is believed to cure, like all doctors, and to perform miracles of the fakir type, like all magicians [...] But beyond this, he is a psychopomp, and he may also be a priest, mystic, and poet.

If we define shamanism this way, Eliade claims, we find that the term covers a collection of phenomena that share a common and unique "structure" and "history." (When thus defined, shamanism tends to occur in its purest forms in hunting and pastoral societies like those of Siberia and Central Asia, which revere a celestial High God "on the way to becoming a 'deus otiosus'." Eliade takes the shamanism of those regions as his most representative example.)

In his examinations of shamanism, Eliade emphasizes the shaman's attribute of regaining man's condition before the "Fall" out of sacred time: "The most representative mystical experience of the archaic societies, that of shamanism, betrays the Nostalgia for Paradise, the desire to recover the state of freedom and beatitude before 'the Fall'." This concern—which, by itself, is the concern of almost all religious behavior, according to Eliade—manifests itself in specific ways in shamanism.

==== Death, resurrection and secondary functions ====
According to Eliade, one of the most common shamanistic themes is the shaman's supposed death and resurrection. This occurs in particular during his initiation. Often, the procedure is supposed to be performed by spirits who dismember the shaman and strip the flesh from his bones, then put him back together and revive him. In more than one way, this death and resurrection represents the shaman's elevation above human nature.

First, the shaman dies so that he can rise above human nature on a quite literal level. After he has been dismembered by the initiatory spirits, they often replace his old organs with new, magical ones (the shaman dies to his profane self so that he can rise again as a new, sanctified being). Second, by being reduced to his bones, the shaman experiences rebirth on a more symbolic level: in many hunting and herding societies, the bone represents the source of life, so reduction to a skeleton "is equivalent to re-entering the womb of this primordial life, that is, to a complete renewal, a mystical rebirth". Eliade considers this return to the source of life essentially equivalent to the eternal return.

Third, the shamanistic phenomenon of repeated death and resurrection also represents a transfiguration in other ways. The shaman dies not once but many times: having died during initiation and risen again with new powers, the shaman can send his spirit out of his body on errands; thus, his whole career consists of repeated deaths and resurrections. The shaman's new ability to die and return to life shows that he is no longer bound by the laws of profane time, particularly the law of death: "the ability to 'die' and come to life again [...] denotes that [the shaman] has surpassed the human condition."

Having risen above the human condition, the shaman is not bound by the flow of history. Therefore, he enjoys the conditions of the mythical age. In many myths, humans can speak with animals; and, after their initiations, many shamans claim to be able to communicate with animals. According to Eliade, this is one manifestation of the shaman's return to "the illud tempus described to us by the paradisiac myths."

The shaman can descend to the underworld or ascend to heaven, often by climbing the World Tree, the cosmic pillar, the sacred ladder, or some other form of the axis mundi. Often, the shaman will ascend to heaven to speak with the High God. Because the gods (particularly the High God, according to Eliade's deus otiosus concept) were closer to humans during the mythical age; the shaman's easy communication with the High God represents an abolition of history and a return to the mythical age.

Because of his ability to communicate with the gods and descend to the land of the dead, the shaman frequently functions as a psychopomp and a medicine man.

== Philosophy ==
=== Early contributions ===
In addition to his political essays, the young Mircea Eliade authored others, philosophical in content. Connected with the ideology of Trăirism, they were often prophetic in tone, and saw Eliade being hailed as a herald by various representatives of his generation. When Eliade was 21 years old and publishing his Itinerar spiritual, literary critic Şerban Cioculescu described him as "the column leader of the spiritually mystical and Orthodox youth." Cioculescu discussed his "impressive erudition", but argued that it was "occasionally plethoric, poetically inebriating itself through abuse." Cioculescu's colleague Perpessicius saw the young author and his generation as marked by "the specter of war", a notion he connected to various essays of the 1920s and 30s in which Eliade threatened the world with the verdict that a new conflict was looming (while asking that young people be allowed to manifest their will and fully experience freedom before perishing).

One of Eliade's noted contributions in this respect was the 1932 Soliloquii ('Soliloquies'), which explored existential philosophy. George Călinescu who saw in it "an echo of Nae Ionescu's lectures", traced a parallel with the essays of another of Ionescu's disciples, Emil Cioran, while noting that Cioran's were "of a more exulted tone and written in the aphoristic form of Kierkegaard." Călinescu recorded Eliade's rejection of objectivity, citing the author's stated indifference towards any "naïveté" or "contradictions" that the reader could possibly reproach him, as well as his dismissive thoughts of "theoretical data" and mainstream philosophy in general (Eliade saw the latter as "inert, infertile and pathogenic"). Eliade thus argued, "a sincere brain is unassailable, for it denies itself to any relationship with outside truths."

The young writer was however careful to clarify that the existence he took into consideration was not the life of "instincts and personal idiosyncrasies", which he believed determined the lives of many humans, but that of a distinct set comprising "personalities". He described "personalities" as characterized by both "purpose" and "a much more complicated and dangerous alchemy." This differentiation, George Călinescu believed, echoed Ionescu's metaphor of man, seen as "the only animal who can fail at living", and the duck, who "shall remain a duck no matter what it does". According to Eliade, the purpose of personalities is infinity: "consciously and gloriously bringing [existence] to waste, into as many skies as possible, continuously fulfilling and polishing oneself, seeking ascent and not circumference."

In Eliade's view, two roads await man in this process. One is glory, determined by either work or procreation, and the other the asceticism of religion or magic—both, Călinescu believed, were aimed at reaching the absolute, even in those cases where Eliade described the latter as an "abyssal experience" into which man may take the plunge. The critic pointed out that the addition of "a magical solution" to the options taken into consideration seemed to be Eliade's own original contributions to his mentor's philosophy, and proposed that it may have owed inspiration to Julius Evola and his disciples. He also recorded that Eliade applied this concept to human creation, and specifically to artistic creation, citing him describing the latter as "a magical joy, the victorious break of the iron circle" (a reflection of imitatio dei, having salvation for its ultimate goal).

=== Philosopher of religion ===
==== Anti-reductionism and the "transconscious" ====
By profession, Eliade was a historian of religion. However, his scholarly works draw heavily on philosophical and psychological terminology. In addition, they contain a number of philosophical arguments about religion. In particular, Eliade often implies the existence of a universal psychological or spiritual "essence" behind all religious phenomena. Because of these arguments, some have accused Eliade of overgeneralization and "essentialism", or even of promoting a theological agenda under the guise of historical scholarship. However, others argue that Eliade is better understood as a scholar who is willing to openly discuss sacred experience and its consequences. (Note: For example, according to Wendy Doniger (Doniger, "Foreword to the 2004 Edition", Eliade, Shamanism, p. xv.), Eliade has been accused "of being a crypto-theologian"; however, Doniger argues that Eliade is better characterized as "an open hierogian". Likewise, Robert Ellwood (Ellwood, p. 111) denies that Eliade practiced "covert theology".)

In studying religion, Eliade rejects certain "reductionist" approaches. Eliade thinks a religious phenomenon cannot be reduced to a product of culture and history. He insists that, although religion involves "the social man, the economic man, and so forth", nonetheless "all these conditioning factors together do not, of themselves, add up to the life of the spirit."

Using this anti-reductionist position, Eliade argues against those who accuse him of overgeneralizing, of looking for universals at the expense of particulars. Eliade admits that every religious phenomenon is shaped by the particular culture and history that produced it:

When the Son of God incarnated and became the Christ, he had to speak Aramaic; he could only conduct himself as a Hebrew of his times [...] His religious message, however universal it might be, was conditioned by the past and present history of the Hebrew people. If the Son of God had been born in India, his spoken language would have had to conform itself to the structure of the Indian languages.

However, Eliade argues against those he calls "historicist or existentialist philosophers" who do not recognize "man in general" behind particular men produced by particular situations (Eliade cites Immanuel Kant as the likely forerunner of this kind of "historicism".) He adds that human consciousness transcends (is not reducible to) its historical and cultural conditioning, and even suggests the possibility of a "transconscious". By this, Eliade does not necessarily mean anything supernatural or mystical: within the "transconscious", he places religious motifs, symbols, images, and nostalgias that are supposedly universal and whose causes therefore cannot be reduced to historical and cultural conditioning.

==== Platonism and "primitive ontology" ====
According to Eliade, traditional man feels that things "acquire their reality, their identity, only to the extent of their participation in a transcendent reality". To traditional man, the profane world is "meaningless", and a thing rises out of the profane world only by conforming to an ideal, mythical model.

Eliade describes this view of reality as a fundamental part of "primitive ontology" (the study of "existence" or "reality"). Here he sees a similarity with the philosophy of Plato, who believed that physical phenomena are pale and transient imitations of eternal models or "Forms" (see Theory of forms). He argued:

Plato could be regarded as the outstanding philosopher of 'primitive mentality,' that is, as the thinker who succeeded in giving philosophic currency and validity to the modes of life and behavior of archaic humanity.

Eliade thinks the Platonic theory of forms is "primitive ontology" persisting in Greek philosophy. He claims that Platonism is the "most fully elaborated" version of this primitive ontology.

In The Structure of Religious Knowing: Encountering the Sacred in Eliade and Lonergan, John Daniel Dadosky argues that, by making this statement, Eliade was acknowledging "indebtedness to Greek philosophy in general, and to Plato's theory of forms specifically, for his own theory of archetypes and repetition". However, Dadosky also states that "one should be cautious when trying to assess Eliade's indebtedness to Plato". Dadosky quotes Robert Segal, a professor of religion, who draws a distinction between Platonism and Eliade's "primitive ontology": for Eliade, the ideal models are patterns that a person or object may or may not imitate; for Plato, there is a Form for everything, and everything imitates a Form by the very fact that it exists.

==== Existentialism and secularism ====
Behind the diverse cultural forms of different religions, Eliade proposes a universal: traditional man, he claims, "always believes that there is an absolute reality, the sacred, which transcends this world but manifests itself in this world, thereby sanctifying it and making it real." Furthermore, traditional man's behavior gains purpose and meaning through the Sacred: "By imitating divine behavior, man puts and keeps himself close to the gods—that is, in the real and the significant." According to Eliade, "modern nonreligious man assumes a new existential situation." For traditional man, historical events gain significance by imitating sacred, transcendent events. In contrast, nonreligious man lacks sacred models for how history or human behavior should be, so he must decide on his own how history should proceed—he "regards himself solely as the subject and agent of history, and refuses all appeal to transcendence".

From the standpoint of religious thought, the world has an objective purpose established by mythical events, to which man should conform himself: "Myth teaches [religious man] the primordial 'stories' that have constituted him existentially." From the standpoint of secular thought, any purpose must be invented and imposed on the world by man. Because of this new "existential situation", Eliade argues, the Sacred becomes the primary obstacle to nonreligious man's "freedom". In viewing himself as the proper maker of history, nonreligious man resists all notions of an externally (for instance, divinely) imposed order or model he must obey: modern man "makes himself, and he only makes himself completely in proportion as he desacralizes himself and the world. [...] He will not truly be free until he has killed the last god."

==== Religious survivals in the secular world ====
Eliade says that secular man cannot escape his bondage to religious thought. By its very nature, secularism depends on religion for its sense of identity: by resisting sacred models, by insisting that man make history on his own, secular man identifies himself only through opposition to religious thought: "He [secular man] recognizes himself in proportion as he 'frees' and 'purifies' himself from the 'superstitions' of his ancestors."b Furthermore, modern man "still retains a large stock of camouflaged myths and degenerated rituals". For example, modern social events still have similarities to traditional initiation rituals, and modern novels feature mythical motifs and themes. Finally, secular man still participates in something like the eternal return: by reading modern literature, "modern man succeeds in obtaining an 'escape from time' comparable to the 'emergence from time' effected by myths".

Eliade sees traces of religious thought even in secular academia. He thinks modern scientists are motivated by the religious desire to return to the sacred time of origins:

One could say that the anxious search for the origins of Life and Mind; the fascination in the 'mysteries of Nature'; the urge to penetrate and decipher the inner structure of Matter—all these longings and drives denote a sort of nostalgia for the primordial, for the original universal matrix. Matter, Substance, represents the absolute origin, the beginning of all things.b

Eliade believes the rise of materialism in the 19th century forced the religious nostalgia for "origins" to express itself in science. He mentions his own field of History of Religions as one of the fields that was obsessed with origins during the 19th century:

The new discipline of History of Religions developed rapidly in this cultural context. And, of course, it followed a like pattern: the positivistic approach to the facts and the search for origins, for the very beginning of religion.

All Western historiography was during that time obsessed with the quest of origins. [...] This search for the origins of human institutions and cultural creations prolongs and completes the naturalist's quest for the origin of species, the biologist's dream of grasping the origin of life, the geologist's and the astronomer's endeavor to understand the origin of the Earth and the Universe. From a psychological point of view, one can decipher here the same nostalgia for the 'primordial' and the 'original'.

In some of his writings, Eliade describes modern political ideologies as secularized mythology. According to Eliade, Marxism "takes up and carries on one of the great eschatological myths of the Middle Eastern and Mediterranean world, namely: the redemptive part to be played by the Just (the 'elect', the 'anointed', the 'innocent', the 'missioners', in our own days the proletariat), whose sufferings are invoked to change the ontological status of the world." Eliade sees the widespread myth of the Golden Age, "which, according to a number of traditions, lies at the beginning and the end of History", as the "precedent" for Karl Marx's vision of a classless society. Finally, he sees Marx's belief in the final triumph of the good (the proletariat) over the evil (the bourgeoisie) as "a truly messianic Judaeo-Christian ideology". Despite Marx's hostility toward religion, Eliade implies, his ideology works within a conceptual framework inherited from religious mythology.

Likewise, Eliade notes that Nazism involved a pseudo-pagan mysticism based on ancient Germanic religion. He suggests that the differences between the Nazis' pseudo-Germanic mythology and Marx's pseudo-Judaeo-Christian mythology explain their differing success:

In comparison with the vigorous optimism of the communist myth, the mythology propagated by the national socialists seems particularly inept; and this is not only because of the limitations of the racial myth (how could one imagine that the rest of Europe would voluntarily accept submission to the master-race?), but above all because of the fundamental pessimism of the Germanic mythology. [...] For the eschaton prophesied and expected by the ancient Germans was the ragnarok—that is, a catastrophic end of the world.

==== Modern man and the "terror of history" ====
According to Eliade, modern man displays "traces" of "mythological behavior" because he intensely needs sacred time and the eternal return. Despite modern man's claims to be nonreligious, he ultimately cannot find value in the linear progression of historical events; even modern man feels the "terror of history": "Here too [...] there is always the struggle against Time, the hope to be freed from the weight of 'dead Time,' of the Time that crushes and kills."

This "terror of history" becomes especially acute when violent and threatening historical events confront modern man—the mere fact that a terrible event has happened, that it is part of history, is of little comfort to those who suffer from it. Eliade asks rhetorically how modern man can "tolerate the catastrophes and horrors of history—from collective deportations and massacres to atomic bombings—if beyond them he can glimpse no sign, no transhistorical meaning". He indicates that, if repetitions of mythical events provided sacred value and meaning for history in the eyes of ancient man, modern man has denied the Sacred and must therefore invent value and purpose on his own. Without the Sacred to confer an absolute, objective value upon historical events, modern man is left with "a relativistic or nihilistic view of history" and a resulting "spiritual aridity". In chapter 4 ("The Terror of History") of The Myth of the Eternal Return and chapter 9 ("Religious Symbolism and the Modern Man's Anxiety") of Myths, Dreams, and Mysteries, Eliade argues at length that the rejection of religious thought is a primary cause of modern man's anxieties.

==== Inter-cultural dialogue and a "new humanism" ====
Eliade argues that modern man may escape the "Terror of history" by learning from traditional cultures. For example, Eliade thinks Hinduism has advice for modern Westerners. According to many branches of Hinduism, the world of historical time is illusory, and the only absolute reality is the immortal soul or atman within man. According to Eliade, Hindus thus escape the terror of history by refusing to see historical time as the true reality.

Eliade notes that a Western or Continental philosopher might feel suspicious toward this Hindu view of history:

One can easily guess what a European historical and existentialist philosopher might reply [...] You ask me, he would say, to 'die to History'; but man is not, and he cannot be anything else but History, for his very essence is temporality. You are asking me, then, to give up my authentic existence and to take refuge in an abstraction, in pure Being, in the atman: I am to sacrifice my dignity as a creator of History to live an a-historic, inauthentic existence, empty of all human content. Well, I prefer to put up with my anxiety: at least, it cannot deprive me of a certain heroic grandeur, that of becoming conscious of, and accepting, the human condition.

However, Eliade argues that the Hindu approach to history does not necessarily lead to a rejection of history. On the contrary, in Hinduism historical human existence is not the "absurdity" that many Continental philosophers see it as. According to Hinduism, history is a divine creation, and one may live contentedly within it as long as one maintains a certain degree of detachment from it: "One is devoured by Time, by History, not because one lives in them, but because one thinks them real and, in consequence, one forgets or undervalues eternity." Furthermore, Eliade argues that Westerners can learn from non-Western cultures to see something besides absurdity in suffering and death. Traditional cultures see suffering and death as a rite of passage. In fact, their initiation rituals often involve a symbolic death and resurrection, or symbolic ordeals followed by relief. Thus, Eliade argues, modern man can learn to see his historical ordeals, even death, as necessary initiations into the next stage of one's existence.

Eliade even suggests that traditional thought offers relief from the vague anxiety caused by "our obscure presentiment of the end of the world, or more exactly of the end of our world, our own civilization". Many traditional cultures have myths about the end of their world or civilization; however, these myths do not succeed "in paralysing either Life or Culture". These traditional cultures emphasize cyclic time and, therefore, the inevitable rise of a new world or civilization on the ruins of the old. Thus, they feel comforted even in contemplating the end times.

Eliade argues that a Western spiritual rebirth can happen within the framework of Western spiritual traditions. However, he says, to start this rebirth, Westerners may need to be stimulated by ideas from non-Western cultures. In his Myths, Dreams, and Mysteries, Eliade claims that a "genuine encounter" between cultures "might well constitute the point of departure for a new humanism, upon a world scale".

==== Christianity and the "salvation" of history ====
Eliade sees the Abrahamic religions as a turning point between the ancient, cyclic view of time and the modern, linear view of time, noting that, in their case, sacred events are not limited to a far-off primordial age, but continue throughout history: "time is no longer [only] the circular Time of the Eternal Return; it has become linear and irreversible Time". He thus sees in Christianity the ultimate example of a religion embracing linear, historical time. When God is born as a man, into the stream of history, "all history becomes a theophany". According to Eliade, "Christianity strives to save history". In Christianity, the Sacred enters a human being (Christ) to save humans, but it also enters history to "save" history and turn otherwise ordinary, historical events into something "capable of transmitting a trans-historical message".

From Eliade's perspective, Christianity's "trans-historical message" may be the most important help that modern man could have in confronting the terror of history. In his book Mito ("Myth"), Italian researcher Furio Jesi argues that Eliade denies man the position of a true protagonist in history: for Eliade, true human experience lies not in intellectually "making history", but in man's experiences of joy and grief. Thus, from Eliade's perspective, the Christ story becomes the perfect myth for modern man. In Christianity, God willingly entered historical time by being born as Christ, and accepted the suffering that followed. By identifying with Christ, modern man can learn to confront painful historical events. Ultimately, according to Jesi, Eliade sees Christianity as the only religion that can save man from the "Terror of history".

In Eliade's view, traditional man sees time as an endless repetition of mythical archetypes. In contrast, modern man has abandoned mythical archetypes and entered linear, historical time—in this context, unlike many other religions, Christianity attributes value to historical time. Thus, Eliade concludes, "Christianity incontestably proves to be the religion of 'fallen man'", of modern man who has lost "the paradise of archetypes and repetition".

==== "Modern gnosticism", Romanticism and Eliade's nostalgia ====
In analyzing the similarities between the "mythologists" Eliade, Joseph Campbell and Carl Jung, Robert Ellwood concluded that the three modern mythologists, all of whom believed that myths reveal "timeless truth", fulfilled the role "gnostics" had in antiquity. The diverse religious movements covered by the term "gnosticism" share the basic doctrines that the surrounding world is fundamentally evil or inhospitable, that we are trapped in the world through no fault of our own, and that we can be saved from the world only through secret knowledge (gnosis). Ellwood claimed that the three mythologists were "modern gnostics through and through", remarking,

Whether in Augustan Rome or modern Europe, democracy all too easily gave way to totalitarianism, technology was as readily used for battle as for comfort, and immense wealth lay alongside abysmal poverty. [...] Gnostics past and present sought answers not in the course of outward human events, but in knowledge of the world's beginning, of what lies above and beyond the world, and of the secret places of the human soul. To all this the mythologists spoke, and they acquired large and loyal followings.

According to Ellwood, the mythologists believed in gnosticism's basic doctrines (even if in a secularized form). Ellwood also believes that Romanticism, which stimulated the modern study of mythology, strongly influenced the mythologists. Because Romantics stress that emotion and imagination have the same dignity as reason, Ellwood argues, they tend to think political truth "is known less by rational considerations than by its capacity to fire the passions" and, therefore, that political truth is "very apt to be found [...] in the distant past".

As modern gnostics, Ellwood argues, the three mythologists felt alienated from the surrounding modern world. As scholars, they knew of primordial societies that had operated differently from modern ones. And as people influenced by Romanticism, they saw myths as a saving gnosis that offered "avenues of eternal return to simpler primordial ages when the values that rule the world were forged". In addition, Ellwood identifies Eliade's personal sense of nostalgia as a source for his interest in, or even his theories about, traditional societies. He cites Eliade himself claiming to desire an "eternal return" like that by which traditional man returns to the mythical paradise: "My essential preoccupation is precisely the means of escaping History, of saving myself through symbol, myth, rite, archetypes".

In Ellwood's view, Eliade's nostalgia was only enhanced by his exile from Romania: "In later years Eliade felt about his own Romanian past as did primal folk about mythic time. He was drawn back to it, yet he knew he could not live there, and that all was not well with it." He suggests that this nostalgia, along with Eliade's sense that "exile is among the profoundest metaphors for all human life", influenced Eliade's theories. Ellwood sees evidence of this in Eliade's concept of the "Terror of history" from which modern man is no longer shielded. In this concept, Ellwood sees an "element of nostalgia" for earlier times "when the sacred was strong and the terror of history had barely raised its head".

== Criticism of Eliade's scholarship ==
=== Overgeneralization ===
Eliade cites a wide variety of myths and rituals to support his theories. However, he has been accused of making overgeneralizations: many scholars think he lacks sufficient evidence to put forth his ideas as universal, or even general, principles of religious thought. According to one scholar, "Eliade may have been the most popular and influential contemporary historian of religion", but "many, if not most, specialists in anthropology, sociology, and even history of religions have either ignored or quickly dismissed" Eliade's works.

The classicist G. S. Kirk criticizes Eliade's insistence that Aboriginal Australians and ancient Mesopotamians had concepts of "being", "non-being", "real", and "becoming", although they lacked words for them. Kirk also believes that Eliade overextends his theories: for example, Eliade claims that the modern myth of the "noble savage" results from the religious tendency to idealize the primordial, mythical age. According to Kirk, "such extravagances, together with a marked repetitiousness, have made Eliade unpopular with many anthropologists and sociologists". In Kirk's view, Eliade derived his theory of eternal return from the functions of Australian Aboriginal mythology and then proceeded to apply the theory to other mythologies to which it did not apply. For example, Kirk argues that the eternal return does not accurately describe the functions of Native American or Greek mythology. Kirk concludes, "Eliade's idea is a valuable perception about certain myths, not a guide to the proper understanding of all of them".

Even Wendy Doniger, Eliade's successor at the University of Chicago, claims (in an introduction to Eliade's own Shamanism) that the eternal return does not apply to all myths and rituals, although it may apply to many of them. However, although Doniger agrees that Eliade made overgeneralizations, she notes that his willingness to "argue boldly for universals" allowed him to see patterns "that spanned the entire globe and the whole of human history". Whether they were true or not, she argues, Eliade's theories are still useful "as starting points for the comparative study of religion". She also argues that Eliade's theories have been able to accommodate "new data to which Eliade did not have access".

=== Lack of empirical support ===
Several researchers have criticized Eliade's work as having no empirical support. Thus, he is said to have "failed to provide an adequate methodology for the history of religions and to establish this discipline as an empirical science", though the same critics admit that "the history of religions should not aim at being an empirical science anyway". Specifically, his claim that the sacred is a structure of human consciousness is distrusted as not being empirically provable: "no one has yet turned up the basic category sacred". Also, there has been mention of his tendency to ignore the social aspects of religion. Anthropologist Alice Kehoe is highly critical of Eliade's work on Shamanism, namely because he was not an anthropologist but a historian. She contends that Eliade never did any field work or contacted any indigenous groups that practiced Shamanism, and that his work was synthesized from various sources without being supported by direct field research.

In contrast, Professor Kees W. Bolle of the University of California, Los Angeles argues that "Professor Eliade's approach, in all his works, is empirical": Bolle sets Eliade apart for what he sees as Eliade's particularly close "attention to the various particular motifs" of different myths. French researcher Daniel Dubuisson places doubt on Eliade's scholarship and its scientific character, citing the Romanian academic's alleged refusal to accept the treatment of religions in their historical and cultural context, and proposing that Eliade's notion of hierophany refers to the actual existence of a supernatural level.

Ronald Inden, a historian of India and University of Chicago professor, criticized Mircea Eliade, alongside other intellectual figures (Carl Jung and Joseph Campbell among them), for encouraging a "romantic view" of Hinduism. He argued that their approach to the subject relied mainly on an Orientalist approach, and made Hinduism seem like "a private realm of the imagination and the religious which modern, Western man lacks but needs."

=== Far-right and nationalist influences ===
Although his scholarly work was never subordinated to his early political beliefs, the school of thought he was associated with in interwar Romania, namely Trăirism, as well as the works of Julius Evola he continued to draw inspiration from, have thematic links to fascism. Writer and academic Marcel Tolcea has argued that, through Evola's particular interpretation of Guénon's works, Eliade kept a traceable connection with far right ideologies in his academic contributions. Daniel Dubuisson singled out Eliade's concept of homo religiosus as a reflection of fascist elitism, and argued that the Romanian scholar's views of Judaism and the Old Testament, which depicted Hebrews as the enemies of an ancient cosmic religion, were ultimately the preservation of an antisemitic discourse.

A piece authored in 1930 saw Eliade defining Julius Evola as a great thinker and offering praise to the controversial intellectuals Oswald Spengler, Arthur de Gobineau, Houston Stewart Chamberlain and the Nazi ideologue Alfred Rosenberg. Evola, who continued to defend the core principles of mystical fascism, once protested to Eliade about the latter's failure to cite him and Guénon. Eliade replied that his works were written for a contemporary public, and not to initiates of esoteric circles. After the 1960s, he, together with Evola, Louis Rougier, and other intellectuals, offered support to Alain de Benoist's controversial Groupement de recherche et d'études pour la civilisation européenne, part of the Nouvelle Droite intellectual trend.

Notably, Eliade was also preoccupied with the cult of Thracian deity Zalmoxis and its supposed monotheism. This, like his conclusion that Romanization had been superficial inside Roman Dacia, was a view celebrated by contemporary partisans of protochronist nationalism. According to historian Sorin Antohi, Eliade may have actually encouraged protochronists such as Edgar Papu to carry out research which resulted in the claim that medieval Romanians had anticipated the Renaissance.

In his study of Eliade, Jung, and Campbell, Ellwood also discusses the connection between academic theories and controversial political involvements, noting that all three mythologists have been accused of reactionary political positions. Ellwood notes the obvious parallel between the conservatism of myth, which speaks of a primordial golden age, and the conservatism of far right politics. However, Ellwood argues that the explanation is more complex than that. Wherever their political sympathies may have sometimes been, he claims, the three mythologists were often "apolitical if not antipolitical, scorning any this-worldly salvation". Moreover, the connection between mythology and politics differs for each of the mythologists in question: in Eliade's case, Ellwood believes, a strong sense of nostalgia ("for childhood, for historical times past, for cosmic religion, for paradise"), influenced not only the scholar's academic interests, but also his political views.

Because Eliade stayed out of politics during his later life, Ellwood tries to extract an implicit political philosophy from Eliade's scholarly works. Ellwood argues that the later Eliade's nostalgia for ancient traditions did not make him a political reactionary, even a quiet one. He concludes that the later Eliade was, in fact, a "radical modernist". According to Ellwood,

Those who see Eliade's fascination with the primordial as merely reactionary in the ordinary political or religious sense of the word do not understand the mature Eliade in a sufficiently radical way. [...] Tradition was not for him exactly Burkean 'prescription' or sacred trust to be kept alive generation after generation, for Eliade was fully aware that tradition, like men and nations, lives only by changing and even occultation. The tack is not to try fruitlessly to keep it unchanging, but to discover where it is hiding.

According to Eliade, religious elements survive in secular culture, but in new, "camouflaged" forms. Thus, Ellwood believes that the later Eliade probably thought modern man should preserve elements of the past, but should not try to restore their original form through reactionary politics. He suspects that Eliade would have favored "a minimal rather than a maximalist state" that would allow personal spiritual transformation without enforcing it.

Many scholars have accused Eliade of "essentialism", a type of overgeneralization in which one incorrectly attributes a common "essence" to a whole group—in this case, all "religious" or "traditional" societies. Furthermore, some see a connection between Eliade's essentialism with regard to religion and fascist essentialism with regard to races and nations. To Ellwood, this connection "seems rather tortured, in the end amounting to little more than an ad hominem argument which attempts to tar Eliade's entire [scholarly] work with the ill-repute all decent people feel for storm troopers and the Iron Guard". However, Ellwood admits that common tendencies in "mythological thinking" may have caused Eliade, as well as Jung and Campbell, to view certain groups in an "essentialist" way, and that this may explain their purported antisemitism: "A tendency to think in generic terms of peoples, races, religions, or parties, which as we shall see is undoubtedly the profoundest flaw in mythological thinking, including that of such modern mythologists as our three, can connect with nascent anti-Semitism, or the connection can be the other way."

== Literary works ==
=== Generic traits ===
Many of Mircea Eliade's literary works, in particular his earliest ones, are noted for their eroticism and their focus on subjective experience. Modernist in style, they have drawn comparisons to the contemporary writings of Mihail Sebastian, I. Valerian, and Ion Biberi. Alongside Honoré de Balzac and Giovanni Papini, his literary passions included Aldous Huxley and Miguel de Unamuno, as well as André Gide. Eliade also read with interest the prose of Romain Rolland, Henrik Ibsen, and the Enlightenment thinkers Voltaire and Denis Diderot. As a youth, he read the works of Romanian authors such as Liviu Rebreanu and Panait Istrati; initially, he was also interested in Ionel Teodoreanu's prose works, but later rejected them and criticized their author.

Investigating the works' main characteristics, George Călinescu stressed that Eliade owed much of his style to the direct influence of French author André Gide, concluding that, alongside Camil Petrescu and a few others, Eliade was among Gide's leading disciples in Romanian literature. He commented that, like Gide, Eliade believed that the artist "does not take a stand, but experiences good and evil while setting himself free from both, maintaining an intact curiosity." A specific aspect of this focus on experience is sexual experimentation—Călinescu notes that Eliade's fiction works tend to depict a male figure "possessing all practicable women in [a given] family". He also considered that, as a rule, Eliade depicts woman as "a basic means for a sexual experience and repudiated with harsh egotism."

For Călinescu, such a perspective on life culminated in "banality", leaving authors gripped by the "cult of the self" and "a contempt for literature". Polemically, Călinescu proposed that Mircea Eliade's supposed focus on "aggressive youth" served to instill his interwar Romanian writers with the idea that they had a common destiny as a generation apart. He also commented that, when set in Romania, Mircea Eliade's stories lacked the "perception of immediate reality", and, analyzing the non-traditional names the writer tended to ascribe to his Romanian characters, that they did not depict "specificity". Additionally, in Călinescu's view, Eliade's stories were often "sensationalist compositions of the illustrated magazine kind." Mircea Eliade's assessment of his own pre-1940 literary contributions oscillated between expressions of pride and the bitter verdict that they were written for "an audience of little ladies and high school students".

A secondary but unifying feature present in most of Eliade's stories is their setting, a magical and part-fictional Bucharest. In part, they also serve to illustrate or allude to Eliade's own research in the field of religion, as well as to the concepts he introduced. Thus, commentators such as Matei Călinescu and Carmen Mușat have also argued that a main characteristic of Eliade's fantasy prose is a substitution between the supernatural and the mundane: in this interpretation, Eliade turns the daily world into an incomprehensible place, while the intrusive supernatural aspect promises to offer the sense of life. The notion was in turn linked to Eliade's own thoughts on transcendence, and in particular his idea that, once "camouflaged" in life or history, miracles become "unrecognizable".

=== Oriental-themed novels ===
==== Isabel și apele diavolului ====
One of Eliade's earliest fiction writings, the controversial first-person narrative Isabel şi apele diavolului ('Isabel and the Devil's Waters'), focused on the figure of a young and brilliant academic, whose self-declared fear is that of "being common". The hero's experience is recorded in "notebooks", which are compiled to form the actual narrative, and which serve to record his unusual, mostly sexual, experiences in British India—the narrator describes himself as dominated by "a devilish indifference" towards "all things having to do with art or metaphysics", focusing instead on eroticism. The guest of a pastor, the scholar ponders sexual adventures with his host's wife, servant girl, and finally with his daughter Isabel. Persuading the pastor's adolescent son to run away from home, becoming the sexual initiator of a twelve-year-old girl and the lover of a much older woman, the character also attempts to seduce Isabel. Although she falls in love, the young woman does not give in to his pressures, but eventually allows herself to be abused and impregnated by another character, letting the object of her affection know that she had thought of him all along.

==== Maitreyi ====
One of Eliade's best-known works, the novel Maitreyi, dwells on Eliade's own experience, comprising camouflaged details of his relationships with Surendranath Dasgupta and Dasgupta's daughter Maitreyi Devi. The main character, Allan, is an Englishman who visits the Indian engineer Narendra Sen and courts his daughter, herself known as Maitreyi. The narrative is again built on "notebooks" to which Allan adds his comments. This technique Călinescu describes as "boring", and its result "cynical".

Allan himself stands alongside Eliade's male characters, whose focus is on action, sensation and experience—his chaste contacts with Maitreyi are encouraged by Sen, who hopes for a marriage which is nonetheless abhorred by his would-be European son-in-law. Instead, Allan is fascinated to discover Maitreyi's Oriental version of Platonic love, marked by spiritual attachment more than by physical contact. However, their affair soon after turns physical, and she decides to attach herself to Allan as one would to a husband, in what is an informal and intimate wedding ceremony (which sees her vowing her love and invoking an earth goddess as the seal of union). Upon discovering this, Narendra Sen becomes enraged, rejecting their guest and keeping Maitreyi in confinement. As a result, his daughter decides to have intercourse with a lowly stranger, becoming pregnant in the hope that her parents would consequently allow her to marry her lover. However, the story also casts doubt on her earlier actions, reflecting rumors that Maitreyi was not a virgin at the time she and Allan first met, which also seems to expose her father as a hypocrite.

George Călinescu objected to the narrative, arguing that both the physical affair and the father's rage seemed artificial, while commenting that Eliade placing doubt on his Indian characters' honesty had turned the plot into a piece of "ethnological humor". Noting that the work developed on a classical theme of miscegenation, which recalled the prose of François-René de Chateaubriand and Pierre Loti, the critic proposed that its main merit was in introducing the exotic novel to local literature.

==== Șantier ====
Mircea Eliade's other early works include Șantier ('Building Site'), a part-novel, part-diary account of his Indian sojourn. George Călinescu objected to its "monotony", and, noting that it featured a set of "intelligent observations", criticized the "banality of its ideological conversations." Șantier was also noted for its portrayal of drug addiction and intoxication with opium, both of which could have referred to Eliade's actual travel experience.

=== Portraits of a generation ===
==== Novel of the Nearsighted Adolescent ====
In his earliest novel, titled Novel of the Nearsighted Adolescent and written in the first person, Eliade depicts his experience through high school. It is proof of the influence exercised on him by the literature of Giovanni Papini, and in particular by Papini's story Un uomo finito. Each of its chapters reads like an independent novella, and, in all, the work experiments with the limits traced between novel and diary. Literary critic Eugen Simion called it "the most valuable" among Eliade's earliest literary attempts, but noted that, being "ambitious", the book had failed to achieve "an aesthetically satisfactory format". According to Simion, the innovative intent of the Novel... was provided by its technique, by its goal of providing authenticity in depicting experiences, and by its insight into adolescent psychology. The novel notably shows its narrator practicing self-flagellation.

==== Întoarcerea din rai ====
Eliade's 1934 novel Întoarcerea din rai ("Return from Paradise") centers on Pavel Anicet, a young man who seeks knowledge through what Călinescu defined as "sexual excess". His search leaves him with a reduced sensitivity: right after being confronted with his father's death, Anicet breaks out in tears only after sitting through an entire dinner.

The other characters, standing for Eliade's generation, all seek knowledge through violence or retreat from the world—nonetheless, unlike Anicet, they ultimately fail at imposing rigors upon themselves. Pavel himself eventually abandons his belief in sex as a means for enlightenment, and commits suicide in hopes of reaching the level of primordial unity. The solution, George Călinescu noted, mirrored the strange murder in Gide's Lafcadio's Adventures. Eliade himself indicated that the book dealt with the "loss of the beatitude, illusions, and optimism that had dominated the first twenty years of 'Greater Romania'." Robert Ellwood connected the work to Eliade's recurring sense of loss in respect to the "atmosphere of euphoria and faith" of his adolescence. Călinescu criticizes Întoarcerea din rai, describing its dialog sequences as "awkward", its narrative as "void", and its artistic interest as "non-existent", proposing that the reader could however find it relevant as the "document of a mentality".

==== Huliganii ====
The novel Huliganii ('The Hooligans') is intended as the fresco of a family, and, through it, that of an entire generation. The book's main protagonist, Petru Anicet, is a composer who places value in experiments; other characters include Dragu, who considers "a hooligan's experience" as "the only fertile debut into life", and the totalitarian Alexandru Pleşa, who is on the search for "the heroic life" by enlisting youth in "perfect regiments, equally intoxicated by a collective myth."

Călinescu thought that the young male characters all owed inspiration to Fyodor Dostoevsky's Rodion Romanovich Raskolnikov (see Crime and Punishment). Anicet, who partly shares Pleșa's vision for a collective experiment, is also prone to sexual adventures, and seduces the women of the Lecca family (who have hired him as a piano teacher). Romanian-born novelist Norman Manea called Anicet's experiment: "the paraded defiance of bourgeois conventions, in which venereal disease and lubricity dwell together." In one episode of the book, Anicet convinces Anișoara Lecca to gratuitously steal from her parents—an outrage which leads his mother to moral decay and, eventually, to suicide. George Călinescu criticized the book for inconsistencies and "excesses in Dostoyevskianism", but noted that the Lecca family portrayal was "suggestive", and that the dramatic scenes were written with "a remarkable poetic calm".

==== Marriage in Heaven ====
The novel Marriage in Heaven depicts the correspondence between two male friends, an artist and a common man, who complain to each other about their failures in love: the former complains about a lover who wanted his children when he did not, while the other recalls being abandoned by a woman who, despite his intentions, did not want to become pregnant by him. Eliade lets the reader understand that they are in fact talking about the same woman.

=== Fantastic and fantasy literature ===
Mircea Eliade's earliest works, most of which were published at later stages, belong to the fantasy genre. One of the first such literary exercises to be printed, the 1921 Cum am găsit piatra filosofală, showed its adolescent author's interest in themes that he was to explore throughout his career, in particular esotericism and alchemy. Written in the first person, it depicts an experiment which, for a moment, seems to be the discovery of the philosophers' stone. These early writings also include two sketches for novels: Minunata călătorie a celor cinci cărăbuși in țara furnicilor roșii ('The Wonderful Journey of the Five Beetles into the Land of the Red Ants') and Memoriile unui soldat de plumb ('The Memoirs of a Lead Soldier'). In the former, a company of beetle spies is sent among the red ants—their travel offers a setting for satirical commentary. Eliade himself explained that Memoriile unui soldat de plumb was an ambitious project, designed as a fresco to include the birth of the Universe, abiogenesis, human evolution, and the entire world history.

Eliade's fantasy novel Domnișoara Christina, was, on its own, the topic of a scandal. The novel deals with the fate of an eccentric family, the Moscus, who are haunted by the ghost of a murdered young woman, known as Christina. The apparition shares characteristics with vampires and with strigoi: she is believed to be drinking the blood of cattle and that of a young family member. The young man Egor becomes the object of Christina's desire, and is shown to have intercourse with her. Noting that the plot and setting reminded one of horror fiction works by the German author Hanns Heinz Ewers, and defending Domnişoara Christina in front of harsher criticism, Călinescu nonetheless argued that the "international environment" in which it took place was "upsetting". He also depicted the plot as focused on "major impurity", summarizing the story's references to necrophilia, menstrual fetish and ephebophilia.

==== Șarpele ====
Eliade's short story Șarpele ('The Snake') was described by George Călinescu as "hermetic". While on a trip to the forest, several persons witness a feat of magic performed by the male character Andronic, who summons a snake from the bottom of a river and places it on an island. At the end of the story, Andronic and the female character Dorina are found on the island, naked and locked in a sensual embrace. Călinescu saw the piece as an allusion to Gnosticism, to the Kabbalah, and to Babylonian mythology, while linking the snake to the Greek mythological figure and major serpent symbol Ophion. He was however dissatisfied with this introduction of iconic images, describing it as "languishing".

In Curte la Dionis

In the relation between history and culture, „the memory acts from the event toward the creation, so that the cultural memory is the prisoner of history." When it will liberate itself, the human will escape the labyrinth, according to a character of the In Dionysus’ Court, of which ideal is the cultural memory; but, for him, the amnesia becomes a torment because, although he forgot details of his own existence, he kept the vague impression of a decisive meeting and with the obsession that he is not knowing his place in the universe: he had forgotten the message that he had to transmit to the world.

==== Un om mare ====
The short story Un om mare ('A Big Man'), which Eliade authored during his stay in Portugal, shows a common person, the engineer Cucoanes, who grows steadily and uncontrollably, reaching immense proportions and ultimately disappearing into the wilderness of the Bucegi Mountains. Eliade himself referenced the story and Aldous Huxley's experiments in the same section of his private notes, a matter which allowed Matei Călinescu to propose that Un om mare was a direct product of its author's experience with drugs. The same commentator, who deemed Un om mare "perhaps Eliade's most memorable short story", connected it with the uriași characters present in Romanian folklore.

=== Other writings ===
Eliade reinterpreted the Greek mythological figure Iphigeneia in his eponymous 1941 play. Here, the maiden falls in love with Achilles, and accepts to be sacrificed on the pyre as a means to ensure both her lover's happiness (as predicted by an oracle) and her father Agamemnon's victory in the Trojan War. Discussing the association Iphigenia's character makes between love and death, Romanian theater critic Radu Albala noted that it was a possible echo of Meşterul Manole legend, in which a builder of the Curtea de Argeș Monastery has to sacrifice his wife in exchange for permission to complete work. In contrast with early renditions of the myth by authors such as Euripides and Jean Racine, Eliade's version ends with the sacrifice being carried out in full.

In addition to his fiction, the exiled Eliade authored several volumes of memoirs and diaries and travel writings. They were published sporadically, and covered various stages of his life. One of the earliest such pieces was India, grouping accounts of the travels he made through the Indian subcontinent. Writing for the Spanish journal La Vanguardia, commentator Sergio Vila-Sanjuán described the first volume of Eliade's Autobiography (covering the years 1907 to 1937) as "a great book", while noting that the other main volume was "more conventional and insincere." In Vila-Sanjuán's view, the texts reveal Mircea Eliade himself as "a Dostoyevskyian character", as well as "an accomplished person, a Goethian figure".

A work that drew particular interest was his Jurnal portughez ('Portuguese Diary'), completed during his stay in Lisbon and published only after its author's death. A portion of it dealing with his stay in Romania is believed to have been lost. The travels to Spain, partly recorded in Jurnal portughez, also led to a separate volume, Jurnal cordobez ('Cordoban Diary'), which Eliade compiled from various independent notebooks. Jurnal portughez shows Eliade coping with clinical depression and political crisis, and has been described by Andrei Oișteanu as "an overwhelming [read], through the immense suffering it exhales." Literary historian Paul Cernat argued that part of the volume is "a masterpiece of its time", while concluding that some 700 pages were passable for the "among others" section of Eliade's bibliography. Noting that the book featured parts where Eliade spoke of himself in eulogistic terms, notably comparing himself favorably to Goethe and Romania's national poet Mihai Eminescu, Cernat accused the writer of "egolatry", and deduced that Eliade was "ready to step over dead bodies for the sake of his spiritual 'mission' ". The same passages led philosopher and journalist Cătălin Avramescu to argue that Eliade's behavior was evidence of "megalomania".

Eliade also wrote various essays of literary criticism. In his youth, alongside his study on Julius Evola, he published essays which introduced the Romanian public to representatives of modern Spanish literature and philosophy, among them Adolfo Bonilla San Martín, Miguel de Unamuno, José Ortega y Gasset, Eugenio d'Ors, Vicente Blasco Ibáñez and Marcelino Menéndez y Pelayo. He also wrote an essay on the works of James Joyce, connecting it with his own theories on the eternal return ("[Joyce's literature is] saturated with nostalgia for the myth of the eternal repetition"), and deeming Joyce himself an anti-historicist "archaic" figure among the modernists. In the 1930s, Eliade edited the collected works of Romanian historian Bogdan Petriceicu Hasdeu.

M. L. Ricketts discovered and translated into English a previously unpublished play written by Mircea Eliade in Paris 1946 Aventura Spirituală ('A Spiritual Adventure'). It was published first in Theory in Action – the journal of the Transformative Studies Institute, vol. 5 (2012): 2–58 -, and then in Italian (M. Eliade, Tutto il teatro, Milano: Edizioni Bietti, 2016).

== Controversy: antisemitism and links with the Iron Guard ==
=== Early statements ===
The early years in Eliade's public career show him to have been highly tolerant of Jews in general, and of the Jewish minority in Romania in particular. His early condemnation of Nazi antisemitic policies was accompanied by his caution and moderation in regard to Nae Ionescu's various anti-Jewish attacks.

Late in the 1930s, Mihail Sebastian was marginalized by Romania's antisemitic policies, and came to reflect on his Romanian friend's association with the far right. The subsequent ideological break between him and Eliade has been compared by writer Gabriela Adameșteanu with that between Jean-Paul Sartre and Albert Camus. In his Journal, published long after his 1945 death, Sebastian claimed that Eliade's actions during the 1930s show him to be an antisemite. According to Sebastian, Eliade had been friendly to him until the start of his political commitments, after which he severed all ties. Before their friendship came apart, however, Sebastian claimed that he took notes on their conversations (which he later published) during which Eliade was supposed to have expressed antisemitic views. According to Sebastian, Eliade said in 1939:

The Poles' resistance in Warsaw is a Jewish resistance. Only yids are capable of the blackmail of putting women and children in the front line, to take advantage of the Germans' sense of scruple. The Germans have no interest in the destruction of Romania. Only a pro-German government can save us... What is happening on the frontier with Bukovina is a scandal, because new waves of Jews are flooding into the country. Rather than a Romania again invaded by kikes, it would be better to have a German protectorate.

The friendship between Eliade and Sebastian drastically declined during the war: the latter writer, fearing for his security during the pro-Nazi Ion Antonescu regime (see Romania during World War II), hoped that Eliade, by then a diplomat, could intervene in his favor; however, upon his brief return to Romania, Eliade did not see or approach Sebastian.

Later, Mircea Eliade expressed his regret at not having had the chance to redeem his friendship with Sebastian before the latter was killed in a car accident. Paul Cernat notes that Eliade's statement includes an admission that he "counted on [Sebastian's] support, in order to get back into Romanian life and culture", and proposes that Eliade may have expected his friend to vouch for him in front of hostile authorities. Some of Sebastian's late recordings in his diary show that their author was reflecting with nostalgia on his relationship with Eliade, and that he deplored the outcome.

Eliade provided two distinct explanations for not having met with Sebastian: one was related to his claim of being followed around by the Gestapo, and the other, expressed in his diaries, was that the shame of representing a regime that humiliated Jews had made him avoid facing his former friend. Another take on the matter was advanced in 1972 by the Israeli magazine Toladot, which claimed that, as an official representative, Eliade was aware of Antonescu's agreement to implement the Final Solution in Romania and of how this could affect Sebastian (see Holocaust in Romania). In addition, rumors were sparked that Sebastian and Nina Mareș had a physical relationship, one which could have contributed to the clash between the two literary figures.

Beyond his involvement with a movement known for its antisemitism, Eliade did not usually comment on Jewish issues. However, an article titled Piloții orbi ("The Blind Pilots"), contributed to the journal Vremea in 1936, showed that he supported at least some Iron Guard accusations against the Jewish community:

Since the war [that is, World War I], Jews have occupied the villages of Maramureș and Bukovina, and gained the absolute majority in the towns and cities in Bessarabia. (Note: It was popular prejudice in the late 1930s to claim that Ukrainian Jews in the Soviet Union had obtained Romanian citizenship illegally after crossing the border into Maramureş and Bukovina. In 1938, this accusation served as an excuse for the Octavian Goga-A. C. Cuza government to suspend and review all Jewish citizenship guaranteed after 1923, rendering it very difficult to regain (Ornea, p.391). Eliade's mention of Bessarabia probably refers to an earlier period, being his interpretation of a pre-Greater Romania process.) [...] It would be absurd to expect Jews to resign themselves to become a minority with certain rights and very many duties—after they have tasted the honey of power and conquered as many command positions as they have. Jews are currently fighting with all forces to maintain their positions, expecting a future offensive—and, as far as I am concerned, I understand their fight and admire their vitality, tenacity, genius.

One year later, a text, accompanied by his picture, was featured as answer to an inquiry by the Iron Guard's Buna Vestire about the reasons he had for supporting the movement. A short section of it summarizes an anti-Jewish attitude:

Can the Romanian nation end its life in the saddest decay witnessed by history, undermined by misery and syphilis, conquered by Jews and torn to pieces by foreigners, demoralized, betrayed, sold for a few million lei?

According to the literary critic Z. Ornea, in the 1980s Eliade denied authorship of the text. He explained the use of his signature, his picture, and the picture's caption, as having been applied by the magazine's editor, Mihail Polihroniade, to a piece the latter had written after having failed to obtain Eliade's contribution; he also claimed that, given his respect for Polihroniade, he had not wished to publicize this matter previously.

Eliade ran in the 1937 Romanian general election, as a member of the Everything for the Country Party.

=== Polemics and exile ===
Dumitru G. Danielopol, a fellow diplomat present in London during Eliade's stay in the city, later stated that the latter had identified himself as "a guiding light of [the Iron Guard] movement" and victim of Carol II's repression. In October 1940, as the National Legionary State came into existence, the British Foreign Office blacklisted Mircea Eliade, alongside five other Romanians, due to his Iron Guard connections and suspicions that he was prepared to spy in favor of Nazi Germany. According to various sources, while in Portugal, the diplomat was also preparing to disseminate propaganda in favor of the Iron Guard. In Jurnal portughez, Eliade defines himself as "a Legionary", and speaks of his own "Legionary climax" as a stage he had gone through during the early 1940s.

The depolitisation of Eliade after the start of his diplomatic career was also mistrusted by his former close friend Eugène Ionesco, who indicated that, upon the close of World War II, Eliade's personal beliefs as communicated to his friends amounted to "all is over now that Communism has won". This forms part of Ionesco's severe and succinct review of the careers of Legionary-inspired intellectuals, many of them his friends and former friends, in a letter he sent to Tudor Vianu. In 1946, Ionesco indicated to Petru Comarnescu that he did not want to see either Eliade or Cioran, and that he considered the two of them "Legionaries for ever"—adding "we are hyenas to one another".

Eliade's former friend, the communist Belu Zilber, who was attending the Paris Conference in 1946, refused to see Eliade, arguing that, as an Iron Guard affiliate, the latter had "denounced left-wingers", and contrasting him with Cioran ("They are both Legionaries, but [Cioran] is honest"). Three years later, Eliade's political activities were brought into discussion as he was getting ready to publish a translation of his Techniques du Yoga with the left-leaning Italian company Giulio Einaudi Editore—the denunciation was probably orchestrated by Romanian officials.

In August 1954, when Horia Sima, who led the Iron Guard during its exile, was rejected by a faction inside the movement, Mircea Eliade's name was included on a list of persons who supported the latter—although this may have happened without his consent. According to exiled dissident and novelist Dumitru Ţepeneag, around that date, Eliade expressed his sympathy for Iron Guard members in general, whom he viewed as "courageous". However, according to Robert Ellwood, the Eliade he met in the 1960s was entirely apolitical, remained aloof from "the passionate politics of that era in the United States", and "[r]eportedly [...] never read newspapers" (an assessment shared by Sorin Alexandrescu). Eliade's student Ioan Petru Culianu noted that journalists had come to refer to the Romanian scholar as "the great recluse". Despite Eliade's withdrawal from radical politics, Ellwood indicates, he still remained concerned with Romania's welfare. He saw himself and other exiled Romanian intellectuals as members of a circle who worked to "maintain the culture of a free Romania and, above all, to publish texts that had become unpublishable in Romania itself".

Beginning in 1969, Eliade's past became the subject of public debate in Israel. At the time, historian Gershom Scholem asked Eliade to explain his attitudes, which the latter did using vague terms. As a result of this exchange, Scholem declared his dissatisfaction, and argued that Israel could not extend a welcome to the Romanian academic. During the final years of Eliade's life, his disciple Culianu exposed and publicly criticized his 1930s pro-Iron Guard activities; relations between the two soured as a result. Eliade's other Romanian disciple, Andrei Oişteanu, noted that, in the years following Eliade's death, conversations with various people who had known the scholar had made Culianu less certain of his earlier stances, and had led him to declare: "Mr. Eliade was never antisemitic, a member of the Iron Guard, or pro-Nazi. But, in any case, I am led to believe that he was closer to the Iron Guard than I would have liked to believe."

At an early stage of his polemic with Culianu, Eliade complained in writing that "it is not possible to write an objective history" of the Iron Guard and its leader Corneliu Zelea Codreanu. Arguing that people "would only accept apologetics [...] or executions", he contended: "After Buchenwald and Auschwitz, even honest people cannot afford being objective".

=== Posterity ===
Alongside the arguments introduced by Daniel Dubuisson, criticism of Mircea Eliade's political involvement with antisemitism and fascism came from Adriana Berger, Leon Volovici, Alexandra Lagniel-Lavastine, Florin Țurcanu and others, who have attempted to trace Eliade's antisemitism throughout his work and through his associations with contemporary antisemites, such as the Italian fascist occultist Julius Evola. Volovici, for example, is critical of Eliade not only because of his support for the Iron Guard, but also for spreading antisemitism and anti-Masonry in 1930s Romania. In 1991, exiled novelist Norman Manea published an essay firmly condemning Eliade's attachment to the Iron Guard.

Other scholars, like Bryan S. Rennie, have claimed that there is, to date, no evidence of Eliade's membership, active services rendered, or of any real involvement with any fascist or totalitarian movements or membership organizations, nor that there is any evidence of his continued support for nationalist ideals after their inherently violent nature was revealed. They further assert that there is no imprint of overt political beliefs in Eliade's scholarship, and also claim that Eliade's critics are following political agendas. Romanian scholar Mircea Handoca, editor of Eliade's writings, argues that the controversy surrounding Eliade was encouraged by a group of exiled writers, of whom Manea was a main representative, and believes that Eliade's association with the Guard was a conjectural one, determined by the young author's Christian values and conservative stance, as well as by his belief that a Legionary Romania could mirror Portugal's Estado Novo. Handoca opined that Eliade changed his stance after discovering that the Legionaries had turned violent, and argued that there was no evidence of Eliade's actual affiliation with the Iron Guard as a political movement. Additionally, Joaquín Garrigós, who translated Eliade's works into Spanish, claimed that none of Eliade's texts he ever encountered show him to be an antisemite. Mircea Eliade's nephew and commentator Sorin Alexandrescu himself proposed that Eliade's politics were essentially conservative and patriotic, in part motivated by a fear of the Soviet Union which he shared with many other young intellectuals. Based on Mircea Eliade's admiration for Gandhi, various other authors assess that Eliade remained committed to nonviolence.

Robert Ellwood also places Eliade's involvement with the Iron Guard in relation to scholar's conservatism, and connects this aspect of Eliade's life with both his nostalgia and his study of primal societies. According to Ellwood, the part of Eliade that felt attracted to the "freedom of new beginnings suggested by primal myths" is the same part that felt attracted to the Guard, with its almost mythological notion of a new beginning through a "national resurrection". On a more basic level, Ellwood describes Eliade as an "instinctively spiritual" person who saw the Iron Guard as a spiritual movement. In Ellwood's view, Eliade was aware that the "golden age" of antiquity was no longer accessible to secular man, that it could be recalled but not re-established. Thus, a "more accessible" object for nostalgia was a "secondary silver age within the last few hundred years"—the Kingdom of Romania's 19th century cultural renaissance. To the young Eliade, the Iron Guard seemed like a path for returning to the silver age of Romania's glory, being a movement "dedicated to the cultural and national renewal of the Romanian people by appeal to their spiritual roots". Ellwood describes the young Eliade as someone "capable of being fired up by mythological archetypes and with no awareness of the evil that was to be unleashed".

Because of Eliade's withdrawal from politics, and also because the later Eliade's religiosity was very personal and idiosyncratic, Ellwood believes the later Eliade probably would have rejected the "corporate sacred" of the Iron Guard. According to Ellwood, the later Eliade had the same desire for a Romanian "resurrection" that had motivated the early Eliade to support the Iron Guard, but he now channeled it apolitically through his efforts to "maintain the culture of a free Romania" abroad. In one of his writings, Eliade says, "Against the terror of History there are only two possibilities of defense: action or contemplation." According to Ellwood, the young Eliade took the former option, trying to reform the world through action, whereas the older Eliade tried to resist the terror of history intellectually.

Eliade's own version of events, presenting his involvement in far right politics as marginal, was judged to contain several inaccuracies and unverifiable claims. For instance, Eliade depicted his arrest as having been solely caused by his friendship with Nae Ionescu. On another occasion, answering Gershom Scholem's query, he is known to have explicitly denied ever having contributed to Buna Vestire. According to Sorin Antohi, "Eliade died without ever clearly expressing regret for his Iron Guard sympathies". Z. Ornea noted that, in a short section of his Autobiography where he discusses the Einaudi incident, Eliade speaks of "my imprudent acts and errors committed in youth", as "a series of malentendus that would follow me all my life." Ornea commented that this was the only instance where the Romanian academic spoke of his political involvement with a dose of self-criticism, and contrasted the statement with Eliade's usual refusal to discuss his stances "pertinently". Reviewing the arguments brought in support of Eliade, Sergio Vila-Sanjuán concluded: "Nevertheless, Eliade's pro-Legionary columns endure in the newspaper libraries, he never showed his regret for this connection [with the Iron Guard] and always, right up to his final writings, he invoked the figure of his teacher Nae Ionescu."

In his Felix Culpa, Manea directly accused Eliade of having embellished his memoirs to minimize an embarrassing past. A secondary debate surrounding Eliade's alleged unwillingness to dissociate with the Guard took place after Jurnalul portughez saw print. Sorin Alexandrescu expressed a belief that notes in the diary show Eliade's "break with his far right past". Cătălin Avramescu defined this conclusion as "whitewashing", and, answering to Alexandrescu's claim that his uncle's support for the Guard was always superficial, argued that Jurnal portughez and other writings of the time showed Eliade's disenchantment with the Legionaries' Christian stance in tandem with his growing sympathy for Nazism and its pagan messages. Paul Cernat, who stressed that it was the only one of Eliade's autobiographical works not to have been reworked by its author, concluded that the book documented Eliade's own efforts to "camouflage" his political sympathies without rejecting them altogether.

Oișteanu argued that, in old age, Eliade moved away from his earlier stances and even came to sympathize with the non-Marxist Left and the hippie youth movement. He noted that Eliade initially felt apprehensive about the consequences of hippie activism, but that the interests they shared, as well as their advocacy of communalism and free love had made him argue that hippies were "a quasi-religious movement" that was "rediscovering the sacrality of Life". Andrei Oișteanu, who proposed that Eliade's critics were divided into a "maximalist" and a "minimalist" camp (trying to, respectively, enhance or shadow the impact Legionary ideas had on Eliade), argued in favor of moderation, and indicated that Eliade's fascism needed to be correlated to the political choices of his generation.

=== Political symbolism in Eliade's fiction ===
Various critics have traced links between Eliade's fiction works and his political views, or Romanian politics in general. Early on, George Călinescu argued that the totalitarian model outlined in Huliganii was: "An allusion to certain bygone political movements [...], sublimated in the ever so abstruse philosophy of death as a path to knowledge." By contrast, Întoarcerea din rai partly focuses on a failed communist rebellion, which enlists the participation of its main characters.

Iphigenia‍'s story of self-sacrifice, turned voluntary in Eliade's version, was taken by various commentators, beginning with Mihail Sebastian, as a favorable allusion to the Iron Guard's beliefs on commitment and death, as well as to the bloody outcome of the 1941 Legionary Rebellion. Ten years after its premiere, the play was reprinted by Legionary refugees in Argentina: on the occasion, the text was reviewed for publishing by Eliade himself. Reading Iphigenia was what partly sparked Culianu's investigation of his mentor's early political affiliations.

A special debate was sparked by Un om mare. Culianu viewed it as a direct reference to Corneliu Zelea Codreanu and his rise in popularity, an interpretation partly based on the similarity between, on one hand, two monikers ascribed to the Legionary leader (by, respectively, his adversaries and his followers), and, on the other, the main character's name (Cucoanes). Matei Călinescu did not reject Culianu's version, but argued that, on its own, the piece was beyond political interpretations. Commenting on this dialog, literary historian and essayist Mircea Iorgulescu objected to the original verdict, indicating his belief that there was no historical evidence to substantiate Culianu's point of view.

Alongside Eliade's main works, his attempted novel of youth, Minunata călătorie a celor cinci cărăbuși in țara furnicilor roșii, which depicts a population of red ants living in a totalitarian society and forming bands to harass the beetles, was seen as a potential allusion to the Soviet Union and to communism. Despite Eliade's ultimate reception in Communist Romania, this writing could not be published during the period, after censors singled out fragments which they saw as especially problematic.

== Cultural legacy ==
=== Tributes ===
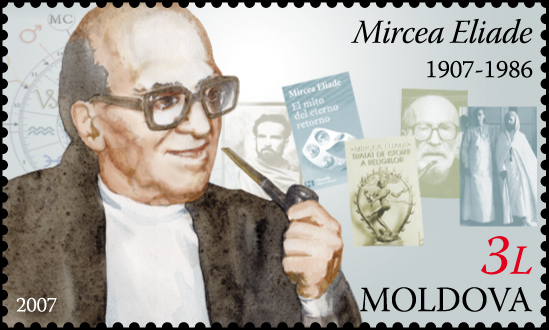
Eliade's portrait on a Moldovan stamp

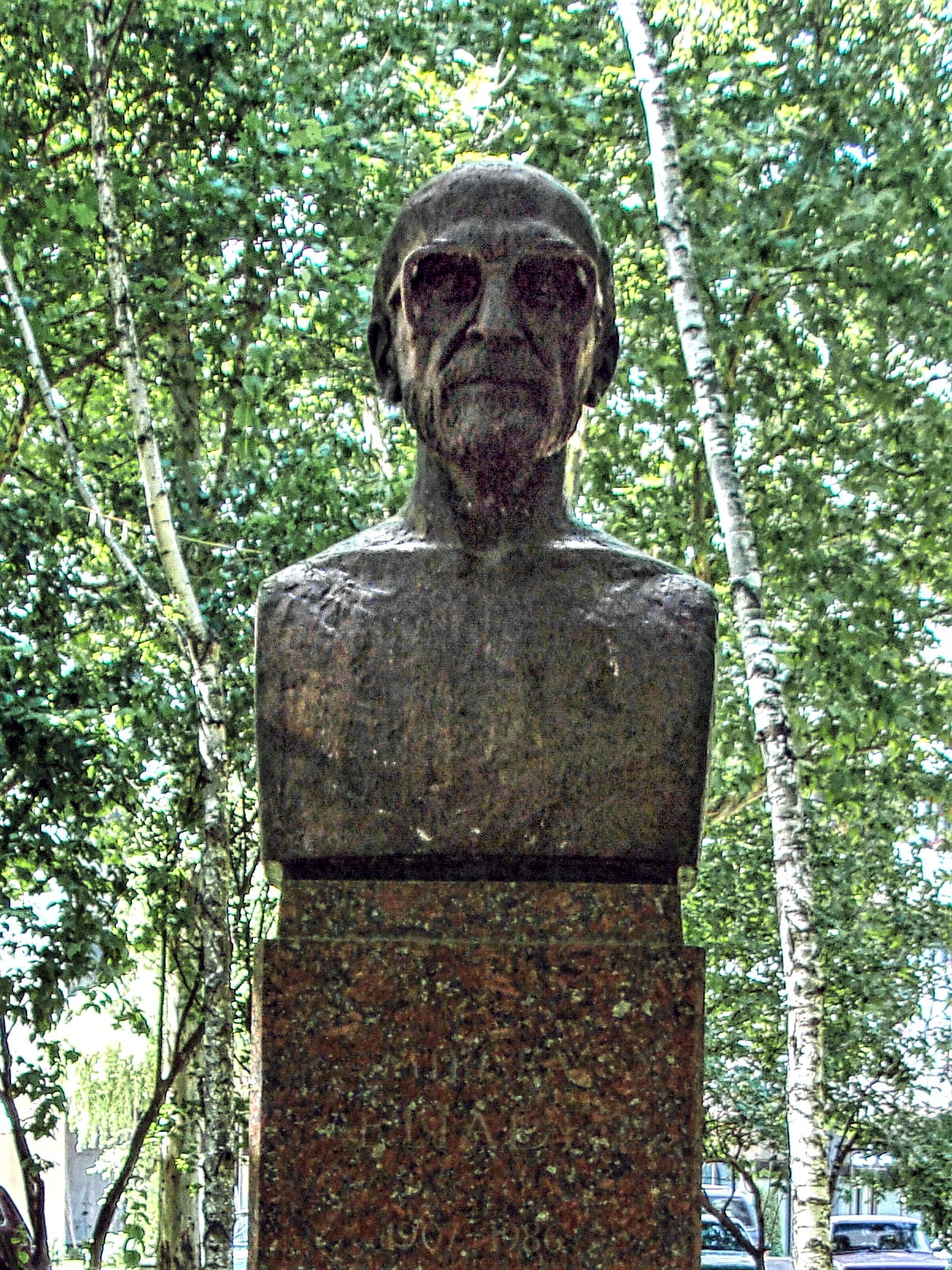
Portrait on the Alley of Classics, Chişinău

An endowed chair in the History of Religions at the University of Chicago Divinity School was named after Eliade in recognition of his wide contribution to the research on this subject; the first holder of this chair is Wendy Doniger, who was succeeded by Brook Ziporyn in 2020.

To evaluate the legacy of Eliade and Joachim Wach within the discipline of the history of religions, the University of Chicago chose 2006 (the intermediate year between the 50th anniversary of Wach's death and the 100th anniversary of Eliade's birth), to hold a two-day conference to reflect upon their academic contributions and their political lives in their social and historical contexts, as well as the relationship between their works and their lives.

In 1990, after the Romanian Revolution, Eliade was elected posthumously to the Romanian Academy. In Romania, Mircea Eliade's legacy in the field of the history of religions is mirrored by the journal Archaeus (founded 1997, and affiliated with the University of Bucharest Faculty of History). The 6th European Association for the Study of Religion and International Association for the History of Religions Special Conference on Religious History of Europe and Asia took place from September 20 to September 23, 2006, in Bucharest. An important section of the Congress was dedicated to the memory of Mircea Eliade, whose legacy in the field of history of religions was scrutinized by various scholars, some of whom were his direct students at the University of Chicago.

As Antohi noted, Eliade, Emil Cioran and Constantin Noica "represent in Romanian culture ultimate expressions of excellence, [Eliade and Cioran] being regarded as proof that Romania's interwar culture (and, by extension, Romanian culture as a whole) was able to reach the ultimate levels of depth, sophistication and creativity." A Romanian Television 1 poll carried out in 2006 nominated Mircea Eliade as the 7th Greatest Romanian in history; his case was argued by the journalist Dragoş Bucurenci (see 100 greatest Romanians). His name was given to a boulevard in the northern Bucharest area of Primăverii, to a street in Cluj-Napoca, and to high schools in Bucharest, Sighişoara, and Reşiţa. The Eliades' house on Melodiei Street was torn down during the communist regime, and an apartment block was raised in its place; his second residence, on Dacia Boulevard, features a memorial plaque in his honor.

Eliade's image in contemporary culture also has political implications. Historian Irina Livezeanu proposed that the respect he enjoys in Romania is matched by that of other "nationalist thinkers and politicians" who "have reentered the contemporary scene largely as heroes of a pre- and anticommunist past", including Nae Ionescu and Cioran, but also Ion Antonescu and Nichifor Crainic. In parallel, according to Oişteanu (who relied his assessment on Eliade's own personal notes), Eliade's interest in the American hippie community was reciprocated by members of the latter, some of whom reportedly viewed Eliade as "a guru".

Eliade has also been hailed as an inspiration by German representatives of the Neue Rechte, claiming legacy from the Conservative Revolutionary movement (among them is the controversial magazine Junge Freiheit and the essayist Karlheinz Weißmann). In 2007, Florin Ţurcanu's biographical volume on Eliade was issued in a German translation by the Antaios publishing house, which is mouthpiece for the Neue Rechte. The edition was not reviewed by the mainstream German press. Other sections of the European far right also claim Eliade as an inspiration, and consider his contacts with the Iron Guard to be a merit—among their representatives are the Italian neofascist Claudio Mutti and Romanian groups who trace their origin to the Legionary Movement.

=== Portrayals, filmography and dramatizations ===
Early on, Mircea Eliade's novels were the subject of satire: before the two of them became friends, Nicolae Steinhardt, using the pen name Antisthius, authored and published parodies of them. Maitreyi Devi, who strongly objected to Eliade's account of their encounter and relationship, wrote her own novel as a reply to his Maitreyi; written in Bengali, it was titled Na Hanyate ('It Does Not Die').

Several authors, including Ioan Petru Culianu, have drawn a parallel between Eugène Ionesco's Absurdist play of 1959, Rhinoceros, which depicts the population of a small town falling victim to a mass metamorphosis, and the impact fascism had on Ionesco's closest friends (Eliade included).

In 2000, Saul Bellow published his controversial Ravelstein novel. Having for its setting the University of Chicago, it had among its characters Radu Grielescu, who was identified by several critics as Eliade. The latter's portrayal, accomplished through statements made by the eponymous character, is polemical: Grielescu, who is identified as a disciple of Nae Ionescu, took part in the Bucharest Pogrom, and is in Chicago as a refugee scholar, searching for the friendship of a Jewish colleague as a means to rehabilitate himself. In 2005, the Romanian literary critic and translator Antoaneta Ralian, who was an acquaintance of Bellow's, argued that much of the negative portrayal was owed to a personal choice Bellow made (after having divorced from Alexandra Bagdasar, his Romanian wife and Eliade disciple). She also mentioned that, during a 1979 interview, Bellow had expressed admiration for Eliade.

The film Mircea Eliade et la redécouverte du Sacré (1987), and part of the television series Architecture et Géographie sacrées by Paul Barbă Neagră, discuss Eliade's works.

==== Film adaptations ====
- The Bengali Night (1988), directed by Nicolas Klotz
- Domnişoara Christina ('Miss Christina', 1992), directed by Viorel Sergovici
- Șarpele ('The Snake', 1996)
- Eu sunt Adam! (1996), directed by Dan Pița
- Youth Without Youth (2007), directed by Francis Ford Coppola
- Domnişoara Christina (2013)

The Bengali Night, a 1988 film directed by Nicolas Klotz and based upon the French translation of Maitreyi, stars British actor Hugh Grant as Allan, the European character based on Eliade, while Supriya Pathak is Gayatri, a character based on Maitreyi Devi (who had refused to be mentioned by name). The film, considered "simply" by Hindu activists, was only shown once in India.

==== Live adaptations ====
- Domnișoara Christina (1981), opera at the Romanian Radio
- Iphigenia (1982), play at the National Theatre Bucharest
- La señorita Cristina (2000), opera at the Teatro Real, Madrid
- Cazul Gavrilescu ('The Gavrilescu Case', 2001), play at the Nottara Theater
- La Țigănci (2003), play at the Odeon Theater
- Apocalipsa după Mircea Eliade ('The Apocalypse According to Mircea Eliade', 2007)

Eliade's Iphigenia was again included in theater programs during the late years of the Nicolae Ceauşescu regime: in January 1982, a new version, directed by Ion Cojar, premiered at the National Theatre Bucharest, starring Mircea Albulescu, Tania Filip and Adrian Pintea in some of the main roles.

La Țigănci has been the basis for two theater adaptations: Cazul Gavrilescu ('The Gavrilescu Case'), directed by Gelu Colceag and hosted by the Nottara Theater; and an eponymous play by director Alexandru Hausvater, first staged by the Odeon Theater in 2003, starring, among others, Adriana Trandafir, Florin Zamfirescu, and Carmen Tănase.

In March 2007, on Eliade's 100th birthday, the Romanian Radio Broadcasting Company hosted the Mircea Eliade Week, during which radio drama adaptations of several works were broadcast. In September of that year, director and dramatist Cezarina Udrescu staged a multimedia performance based on a number of works Mircea Eliade wrote during his stay in Portugal; titled Apocalipsa după Mircea Eliade ('The Apocalypse According to Mircea Eliade'), and shown as part of a Romanian Radio cultural campaign, it starred Ion Caramitru, Oana Pellea and Răzvan Vasilescu.

Domnișoara Christina has been the subject of two operas: the first, carrying the same Romanian title, was authored by Romanian composer Șerban Nichifor and premiered in 1981 at the Romanian Radio; the second, titled La señorita Cristina, was written by Spanish composer Luis de Pablo and premiered in 2000 at the Teatro Real in Madrid.

== Selected bibliography ==
- A History of Religious Ideas. Vol. 1: From the Stone Age to the Eleusinian Mysteries. Trans. Willard R. Trask. Chicago: U of Chicago P, 1978. (Histoire des croyances et des idées religieuses. 3 vols. 1976–83.)
- Images and Symbols: Studies in Religious Symbolism (trans. Philip Mairet), Princeton University Press, Princeton, 1991
- Myth and Reality (trans. Willard R. Trask), Harper & Row, New York, 1963
- Myths, Dreams and Mysteries (trans. Philip Mairet), Harper & Row, New York, 1967
- Myths, Rites, Symbols: A Mircea Eliade Reader, Vol. 2, Ed. Wendell C. Beane and William G. Doty, Harper Colophon, New York, 1976
- Patterns in Comparative Religion, Sheed & Ward, New York, 1958
- Shamanism: Archaic Techniques of Ecstasy, Princeton University Press, Princeton, 2004
- The Myth of the Eternal Return: Cosmos and History (trans. Willard R. Trask), Princeton University Press, Princeton, 1971
- "The Quest for the 'Origins' of Religion", in History of Religions 4.1 (1964), p. 154–169
- The Sacred and the Profane: The Nature of Religion (trans. Willard R. Trask), Harper Torchbooks, New York, 1961
- Hypermnésie et évasion. Doina Ruști, „Philologica Jassyensia", An III, Nr. 1, 2007, p. 235–241
- Yoga: Immortality and Freedom (trans. Willard R. Trask), Princeton University Press, Princeton, 2009
- Isabela Vasiliu-Scraba, Harismele Duhului Sfânt si fotografia "de 14 ani" (Mircea Eliade), în rev. "Acolada", Satu Mare, annul XIV, nr. 12 (157), decembrie 2020, pp. 12–13

== See also ==
- Sântoaderi, supernatural entities found in Romanian folklore
