= Hierophany =

Manifestation of the sacred

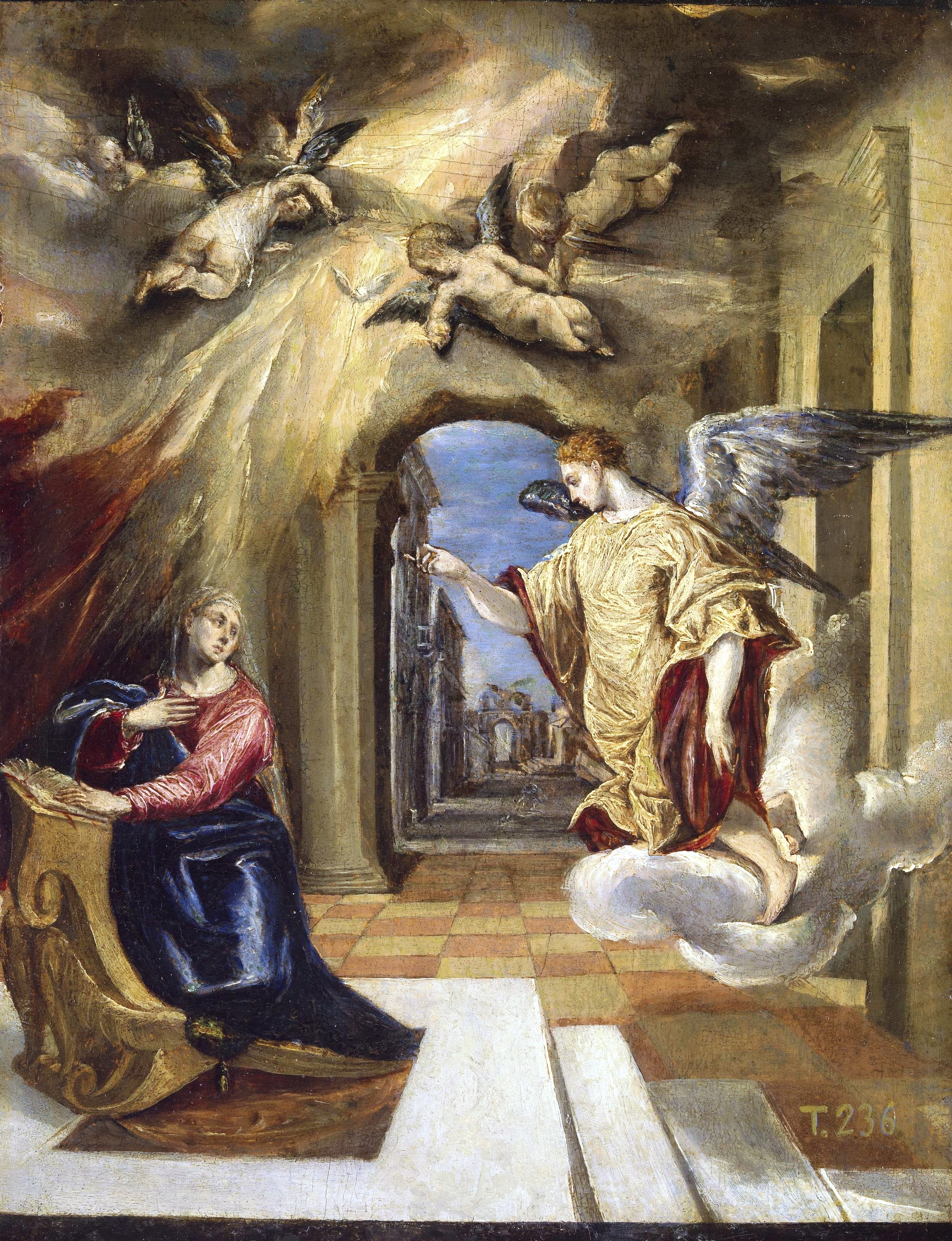

A hierophany is a manifestation of the sacred. The word is a formation of the Greek adjective hieros (Greek: ἱερός, 'sacred, holy') and the verb phainein (φαίνειν, 'to reveal, to bring to light').

== Mircea Eliade ==
The word hierophany recurs frequently in the works of religious historian Mircea Eliade, who preferred the term to the more constrictive word theophany, an appearance of a god.

Eliade argues that religion is based on a sharp distinction between the sacred and the profane. According to Eliade, for traditional man, myths describe "breakthroughs of the sacred (or the 'supernatural') into the World"—that is, hierophanies.

In the hierophanies recorded in myth, the sacred appears in the form of ideal models (the actions and commandments of gods, heroes, etc.). By manifesting itself as an ideal model, the sacred gives the world value, direction, and purpose: "The manifestation of the sacred, ontologically founds the world." According to this view, all things need to imitate or conform to the sacred models established by hierophanies, in order to have true reality: things "acquire their reality, their identity, only to the extent of their participation in a transcendent reality."

== See also ==
- Darśana
- Hierophant
- Sanctification
