= Bryan Rennie (historian) =

American historian (born 1954)

Bryan Rennie (born 1954) is a British historian of religions, the Vira I. Heinz Professor of Religion at Westminster College in New Wilmington, Pennsylvania. Known for his works on Romanian scholar Mircea Eliade, Rennie was awarded the Mircea Eliade Centennial Jubilee Medal for contributions to the History of Religions by then-President Traian Băsescu in 2006.
