= A History of Atheism in China =

Chinese scholarly work

Zhongguo wushenlun shi (simplified Chinese: 中国无神论史; traditional Chinese: 中國無神論史; pinyin: Zhōngguó wúshénlùn shǐ), English: A History of Atheism in China, is a comprehensive scholarly work that systematically explores the history of atheism in Chinese thought. The work is recognized as the first academic history of atheism in Chinese historiography.

Map of atheism in the world (black: China)

== Introduction ==
Edited by Ya Hanzhang 牙含章 (1916–1989) and Wang Yousan 王友三 (1929–), the project was initiated in the early 1980s as a national key research initiative under China's Sixth Five-Year Plan (1981–1985) in the field of social sciences. It brought together more than thirty scholars specializing in Chinese intellectual and religious history. The work was first published in 1992 by the China Social Sciences Press in two volumes. The first volume includes an introduction and chapters covering the Pre-Qin period, the Han dynasties, the Wei, Jin, and Northern and Southern dynasties, as well as the Sui and Tang dynasties. The second volume continues with the Song, Yuan, and Ming dynasties, the Qing dynasty, the modern era, and atheistic thought among China’s ethnic minorities. The text presents a broad and systematic examination of atheistic currents across various historical periods and cultural contexts in China.

According to the editors, the development of atheism in China can be analyzed through two major thematic frameworks. The first concerns the relationship between Heaven and humanity, particularly the discourse surrounding the Mandate of Heaven (tianming 天命) and the philosophical opposition to it. The second addresses the body–spirit relationship (xingshen guanxi 形神关系), especially debates over the existence or nonexistence of spirits, ghosts, and gods (yougui 有鬼 versus wugui 无鬼). The work argues that while ancient Chinese atheism achieved a relatively systematic form in debates over spirits, its treatment of the Mandate of Heaven (tianming) concept followed divergent Confucian and Daoist lines, preventing the formation of a unified atheistic ideology.

A revised edition was published in 2011 by the Chinese Academy of Social Sciences (CASS) as part of the series Dangdai Zhongguo xuezhe daibiaozuo wenku (Library of Representative Works by Contemporary Chinese Scholars), "to promote the development of Chinese atheism and deepen the study of traditional Chinese culture". The republication aimed to promote the continued development of Chinese atheism studies and to deepen engagement with traditional Chinese intellectual culture.

Together with the volumes had been published some volumes of Selected Materials on the History of Atheism in China (Zhongguo wushenlun shi ziliao xuanbian 中国无神论史资料选编), an anthology edited by Wang Yousan 王友三 and annotated by Gu Manjun 顾曼君 and Ma Junnan 马俊南 (Zhonghua, Beijing 1983-2002).

== Table of Contents ==
Introduction

=== Pre-Qin Period ===
1 Introduction
2 The Emergence and Development of Atheism from the Shang and Zhou Dynasties to Spring and Autumn Annals Period 商周至春秋时期无神论的萌芽与发展
3 Guan Zhong and the atheistic tendency of the “Guan Zhong School” 管仲与 “管仲学派 ”的无神论倾向
4 Yan Ying 晏婴
5 Kongzi and Mengzi 孔子与公孟子
6 Fan Li and Sun Wu 范蠡与孙武
7 Dong Wuxin and Ximen Bao 董无心与西门豹
8 Laozi 老子
9 Zhuangzi 庄子
10 Mengzi 孟子
11 Sun Bin and Wei Liaozi 孙膑与尉缭子
12 Xunzi 荀子
13 Han Fei 韩非
14 Lüshi chunqiu, atheistic tendency of the book 《吕氏春秋》一书的无神论倾向

=== Western and Eastern Han Dynasty ===
1 Introduction
2 Neijing, atheistic thinking in the foundations of the medical science of Huangdi neijing《内经》医理的无神论思想
3 Huainanzi und Yang Wangsun 《淮南子》和杨王孙
4 Sima Qian 司马迁
5 Huan Tan 桓谭
6 Zheng Xing and Yin Min 郑兴和尹敏
7 Wang Chong 王充
8 Zhang Heng 张衡
9 Di Wulun, Song Jun, Zhao Zi and superstition in Fengsu tongyi 第五伦、宋均、赵咨与《风俗通义》中的反迷信思想
10 Wang Fu 王符
11 Xun Yue and Zhongchang Tong 荀悦和仲长统

=== Wei, Jin, Southern and Northern Dynasties ===
1 Introduction
2 Cao Zhi 曹植
3 Ji Kang 嵇康
4 Yang Quan and Fu Xuan 杨泉与傅玄
5 Ruan Kan, Guo Xiang, Lu Bao, Bao Jingyan 阮侃、郭象、鲁褒、鲍敬言
6 Ruan Zhan, Ruan Xiu, Zong Dai, Yue Guang, Xie Kun 阮瞻、阮修、宗岱、乐广、谢鲲
7 Sun Sheng, Dai Kui 孙盛、戴逵
8 He Chengtian 何承天
9 Fan Zhen 范缜
10 Liu Jun and Zhu Shiqing 刘峻和朱世卿
11 Fan Xun and Xing Shao 樊逊与邢邵
12 Zu Chongzhi and Jia Sixie 祖冲之与贾思勰

=== Sui, and Tang Dynasty ===
1 Introduction
2 Fu Yi 傅奕
3 Lü Cai 吕才
4 Liu Zhiji 刘知几
5 Lu Cangyong and Li Hua 卢藏用和李华
6 Liu Zongyuan 柳宗元
7 Liu Yuxi 刘禹锡
8 Li Fan, Niu Sengru, Li Deyu 李藩、牛僧孺、李德裕
9 Pi Rixiu 皮日休
10 Wunengzi and Shen Yan《无能子》与沈颜

=== Song, Yuan, and Ming Dynasty ===
1 Introduction
2 Ouyang Xiu 欧阳修
3 Zhang Zai 张载
4 Yu Jing and Wang Anshi 余靖和王安石
5 Shen Kuo and Zheng Qiao 沈括和郑樵
6 Chu Yong 储泳
7 Xie Yingfang 谢应芳
8 Liu Ji 刘基 (Liu Bowen 刘伯温)
9 Cao Duan 曹端
10 Luo Qinshun 罗钦顺
11 Wang Tingxiang 王廷相
12 Lü Kun 吕坤
13 Li Shizhen 李时珍
14 Zhang Juzheng 张居正

=== Qing Dynasty ===
1 Introduction
2 Chen Que 陈确
3 Huang Zongxi 黄宗羲
4 Wang Fuzhi 王夫之
5 Xiong Bolong 熊伯龙
6 Yan Yuan 颜元
7 Feng Jing and Yuan Mei 冯景和袁枚
8 Hong Liangji 洪亮吉
9 Zhou Shuhuai 周树槐

=== Modern times ===
1 Introduction
2 Yan Fu 严复
3 Zhang Binglin 章炳麟
4 Getian and Xu wugui lun《革天》和《续无鬼论》
5 Xin shiji《新世纪》
6 Zhu Zhixin 朱执信
7 Cai Yuanpei 蔡元培
8 Hu Shi 胡适
9 Chen Duxiu 陈独秀
10 Li Dazhao 李大钊

=== Minorities ===
1 Introduction
2 Mengguzu 蒙古族 Mongols
3 Miaozu 苗族 Miao
4 Yizu 彝族 Yi
5 Zhuangzu 壮族 Zhuang
6 Manzu 满族 Manchu
7 Baizu 白族 Bai

== See also ==
- History of atheism
- Marxist–Leninist atheism

== Literature ==
Bibliographic information

- Zhongguo wushenlun shi 中国无神论史, 中国社会科学出版社, 2 volumes, 1992
- Zhongguo wushenlun shi (Chinese: 中国无神论史; pinyin: Zhōngguó wúshénlùn shǐ) in: Dangdai Zhongguo xuezhe daibiaozuo wenku Chinese: 当代中国学者代表作文库. Beijing: Zhongguo shehui kexue chubanshe 中国社会科学出版社, 2011, ISBN 9787500407560 (2 vols.).

Material collection

- Wang Yousan 王友三 (ed.): Zhongguo wushenlun shi ziliao xuanbian 中国无神论史资料选编 [Selected Materials on the History of Atheism in China (Anthology)]. Annotated by Gu Manjun 顾曼君 and Ma Junnan 马俊南. Beijing: Zhonghua shuju. 1983-2002

Volumes:

Xian Qin bian 先秦编 1983 [Pre Qin Period]
Liang Han bian 两汉编 1985 [Western and Eastern Han dynasty]
Wei, Jin, Nan-Bei Chao bian 魏晋南北朝编 1988 [Wei dynasty, Jin dynasty, Southern and Northern dynasties]
Sui, Tang bian 隋唐编 1988 [Sui dynasty, Tang dynasty]
Song, Yuan, Ming bian 宋元明篇 1998 [Song dynasty, Yuan dynasty, Ming dynasty]
Qingdai bian 清代编 2002 [Qing dynasty]
Jindai bian 近代编 2002 [Modern Times]

Other

- Ya Hanzhang 牙含章, Wang Yousan 王友三 (eds.): Zhongguo wushenlun shi yanjiu 中国无神论史研究 [Studies on the History of Atheism in China]. Xining 西宁: Qinghai renmin chubanshe 青海人民出版社 [Qinghai People's Publishing House]: Qinghai sheng Xinhua shudian faxing 青海省新華書店发行, 1986.
- Zhongguo zhexue da cidian 中国哲学大辞典 [Dictionary of Chinese Philosophy]. Zhang Dainian 张岱年 (ed.). Shanghai 上海: Shanghai cishu chubanshe 上海辞书出版社 2010
- Tang Jingzhao 湯敬昭 (Hrsg.): Zhongguo wushenlun sixiang lunwen ji 中国无神论思想论文集 [Collection of essays on atheism in China]. Nanjing: Jiangsu People's Press 1980
- Philip L. Wickeri: Seeking the Common Ground: Protestant Christianity, the Three-Self Movement, and China's United Front. 2011 (Online partial view)
