= Atheos =

Atheos may refer to:

- ἄθεος, in atheism an Ancient Greek term meaning 'godless'
- AtheOS, an operating system
