= Peach gum =

Byproduct of peach trees

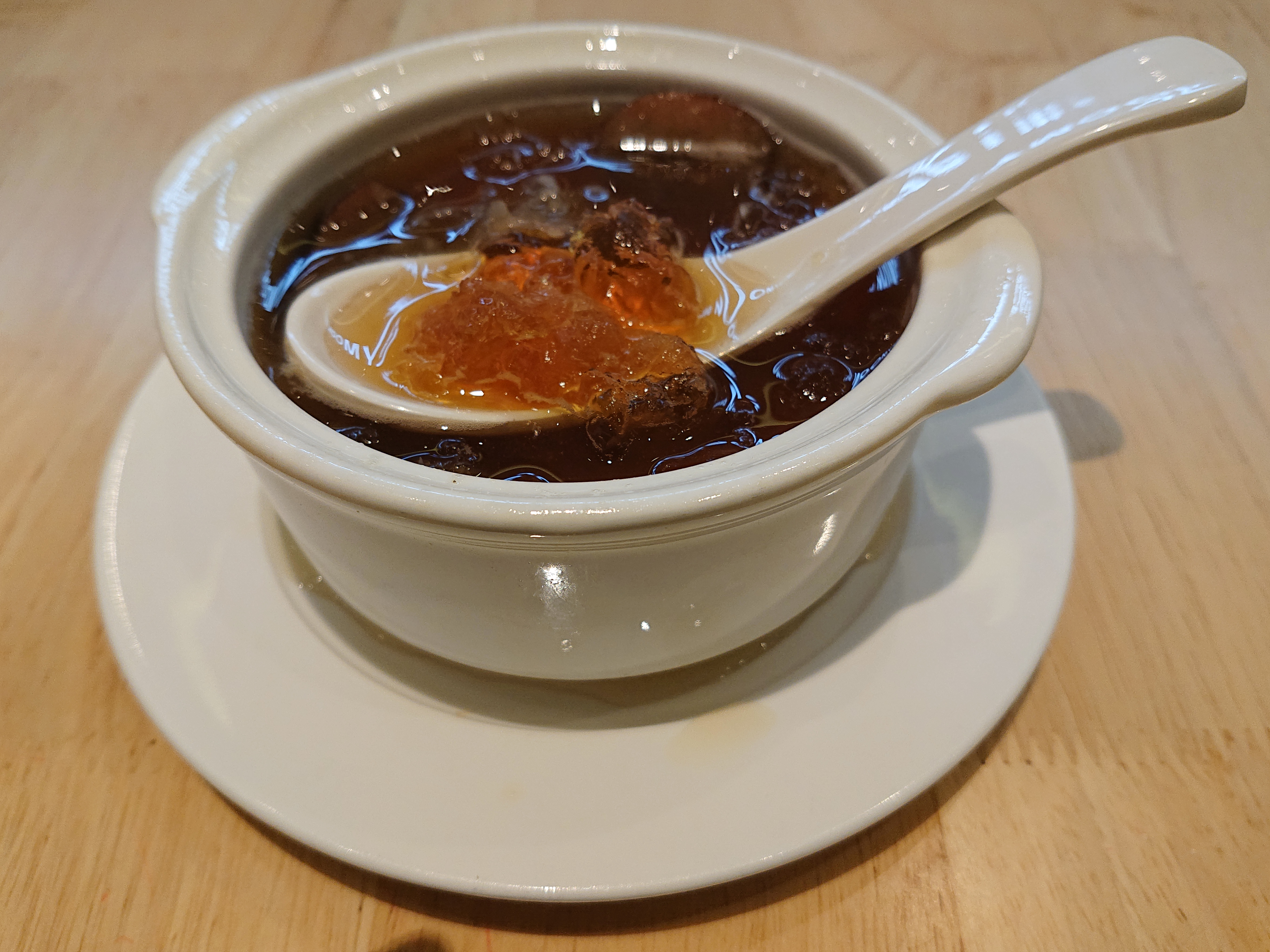
- Peach Resin Sweet Soup
- Alternative names: Peach resin; peach tree gum
- Type: Plant resin; food ingredient
- Region or state: China
- Associated cuisine: Chinese cuisine
- Main ingredients: Polysaccharides

Peach gum (also known as peach resin or peach tree gum) is a natural gum and resinous substance secreted by peach trees (Prunus persica) and related species in the Rosaceae family when the bark is damaged or the tree is stressed.

It has a long history of consumption in China, where it is commonly used in sweet soups, desserts, and beverages. The substance is marketed for various health benefits, including claims about collagen content and skin improvement, though many of these claims lack scientific evidence.

== Formation ==
Peach gum is not a normal product of healthy peach trees. It forms when trees are injured, diseased, or when bark is deliberately cut. The resin seeps from wounds and solidifies when exposed to air and sunlight, forming amber-colored, translucent crystalline pieces.

== Composition ==
The substance is primarily composed of polysaccharides, including galactose, rhamnose, and α-glucuronic acid. It also contains dietary fiber, carbohydrates, proteins, and small amounts of vitamins. Despite marketing claims, peach gum does not contain collagen, which is exclusive to animal tissues.

== Traditional use ==
Peach gum has been documented in traditional Chinese medicine texts, including the Tang Bencao (Tang Materia Medica) and Li Shizhen's Bencao Gangmu (Compendium of Materia Medica) from the Ming Dynasty. Historical texts describe its use for treating urinary issues and other conditions, though these traditional uses have not been validated by modern scientific research.

== Culinary use ==
In modern times, peach gum is primarily used as a food ingredient, particularly in Asian cuisine. It requires soaking in water for 8-12 hours before use, during which it softens and expands significantly. Common preparations include:

- Sweet soups and desserts
- Beverages combined with milk or soy milk
- Porridges and puddings
- Combined with other ingredients such as snow fungus, red dates, or papaya

The texture after preparation is described as gelatinous and slightly chewy.

== Regulatory status ==
In 2023, China's National Health Commission officially approved peach gum as a "new food ingredient," establishing a recommended daily consumption limit of ≤30 grams per day. The regulatory approval noted insufficient safety data for infants, pregnant women, and nursing mothers, recommending these groups avoid consumption.

== Nutrition and health claims ==
While peach gum contains dietary fiber and may have properties similar to other soluble fibers, many health claims about its benefits lack scientific evidence. Some research suggests it may have blood sugar-lowering effects similar to other plant-based dietary fibers, but more rigorous clinical studies are needed.

Marketing claims about collagen content and anti-aging effects are not supported by scientific evidence, as plants do not produce collagen.

== See also ==
- Gum arabic
- Chinese cuisine
