= History of atheism =

Atheism is the rejection of an assertion that a deity exists. In its strictest definition, positive atheism is the position that there are absolutely no deities that exist, while negative atheism is the position that there are probably no deities that exist, but does not state that there are none. The English term 'atheist' was used at least as early as the sixteenth century and atheistic ideas and their influence have a longer history.

Philosophical atheist thought began to appear in Europe and Asia in the sixth or fifth century BCE. In ancient Greece, playwrights expressed doubt regarding the existence of gods and ancient India had an antireligious philosophical school, Charvaka. Materialistic philosophy was produced by the atomists Leucippus and Democritus in 5th century BCE, who explained the world in terms of the movements of atoms moving in infinite space.

The Enlightenment fueled skepticism and secularism against religion in Europe.

== Etymology ==
In early ancient Greek, the adjective átheos (ἄθεος, from the privative ἀ- + θεός 'god') meant 'godless'. It was first used as a term of censure roughly meaning 'ungodly' or 'impious'. In the 5th century BCE, the word began to indicate more deliberate and active godlessness in the sense of "severing relations with the gods" or "denying the gods". The term ἀσεβής (asebēs) then came to be applied against those who impiously denied or disrespected the local gods, even if they believed in other gods. Modern translations of classical texts sometimes render átheos as 'atheistic'. As an abstract noun, there was also ἀθεότης (atheotēs), 'atheism'. Cicero transliterated the Greek word into the Latin átheos. The term found frequent use in the debate between early Christians and Hellenists, with each side attributing it, in the pejorative sense, to the other.

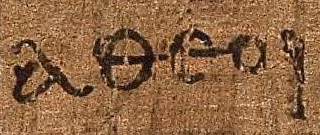
The Greek word αθεοι (atheoi), as it appears in the Epistle to the Ephesians 2:12 on the early 3rd-century Papyrus 46. It is usually translated into English as "[those who are] without God". (Note: The word αθεοι—in any of its forms—appears nowhere else in the Septuagint or the New Testament.)

The term atheist (from the French athée), in the sense of "one who ... denies the existence of God or gods", predates atheism in English, being first found as early as 1566, and again in 1571. Atheist as a label of practical godlessness was used at least as early as 1577.

The term atheism was derived from the French athéisme, and appears in English about 1587. An earlier work, from about 1534, used the term atheonism.

Related words emerged later: deist in 1621, theist in 1662, deism in 1675, and theism in 1678. Deism and theism changed meanings slightly around 1700 due to the influence of atheism; deism was originally used as a synonym for today's theism but came to denote a separate philosophical doctrine.

Atheism was first used to describe a self-avowed belief in late 18th-century Europe, specifically denoting disbelief in the monotheistic Abrahamic god. (Note: In part because of its wide use in monotheistic Western society, atheism is usually described as "disbelief in God", rather than more generally as "disbelief in deities". A clear distinction is rarely drawn in modern writings between these two definitions, but some archaic uses of atheism encompassed only disbelief in the singular God, not in polytheistic deities. It is on this basis that the obsolete term adevism was coined in the late 19th century to describe an absence of belief in plural deities.) In the 20th century, globalization contributed to the expansion of the term to refer to disbelief in all deities, though it remains common in Western society to describe atheism as "disbelief in God".

== Indian philosophy ==
Who really knows?
Who will here proclaim it?
Whence was it produced? Whence is this creation?
The gods came afterwards, with the creation of this universe.
Who then knows whence it has arisen?

— Nasadiya Sukta, concerns the origin of the universe, Rig Veda, 10:129-6

In the East, a contemplative life not centered on the idea of deities began in the sixth century BCE with the rise of Jainism, Buddhism, and various sects of Hinduism in India, and of Taoism in China. These religions offered a philosophic and salvific path not involving deity worship. Deities are not seen as necessary to the salvific goal of the early Buddhist tradition, and that tradition reflects disbelief in a supreme god or a creator god(s). Some Buddhist philosophers assert that belief in an eternal creator god is a distraction from the central task of the religious life, and make arguments against it.

Within the astika ("orthodox") schools of Hindu philosophy, the Samkhya and the early Mimamsa school did not accept a creator-deity in their respective systems.

The principal text of the Samkhya school, the Samkhya Karika, was written by Ishvara Krishna in the fourth century CE, by which time it was already a dominant Hindu school. The origins of the school are much older and are lost in legend. The school was both dualistic and atheistic. They believed in a dual existence of Prakriti ("nature") and Purusha ("consciousness") and had no place for an Ishvara ("God") in its system, arguing that the existence of Ishvara cannot be proved and hence cannot be admitted to exist. The school dominated Hindu philosophy in its day, but declined after the tenth century, although commentaries were still being written as late as the sixteenth century.

The foundational text for the Mimamsa school is the Purva Mimamsa Sutras of Jaimini (c. third to first century BCE). The school reached its height c. 700 CE, and for some time in the Early Middle Ages exerted near-dominant influence on learned Hindu thought. The Mimamsa school saw their primary enquiry was into the nature of dharma based on close interpretation of the Vedas. Its core tenets were ritualism (orthopraxy), antiasceticism and antimysticism. The early Mimamsakas believed in an adrishta ("unseen") that is the result of performing karmas ("works") and saw no need for an Ishvara ("God") in their system. Mimamsa persists in some subschools of Hinduism today.

=== Cārvāka ===
The thoroughly materialistic and antireligious philosophical Cārvāka (also known as Lokayata) school that originated in India with the Bārhaspatya-sūtras (final centuries BCE) is probably the most explicitly atheist school of philosophy in the region, if not the world. These ancient schools of generic skepticism had started to develop far earlier than the Mauryan period. Already in the sixth century BCE Ajita Kesakambalin was quoted in Pali scriptures by the Buddhists with whom he was debating, teaching that "with the break-up of the body, the wise and the foolish alike are annihilated, destroyed. They do not exist after death."

Cārvākan philosophy is now known principally from its Astika and Buddhist opponents. The proper aim of a Cārvākan, according to these sources, was to live a prosperous, happy, productive life in this world. In the book More Studies on the Cārvāka/Lokāyata (Cambridge Scholars Publishing, 2020) Ramkrishna Bhattacharya argues that there have been many varieties of materialist thought in India; and that there is no foundation to the accusations of hedonism nor to the claim that these schools reject inference (anumāna) per se as a way of knowledge (pramāṇas).

The Tattvopaplavasimha of Jayarashi Bhatta (c. 8th century) is sometimes cited as a surviving Carvaka text, as Ethan Mills does in Three Pillars of Skepticism in Classical India: Nagarjuna, Jayarasi, and Sri Harsa (2018). It has been claimed that the school died out sometime around the fifteenth century.

In the oldest of the Upanishads, in chapter 2 of the Brhadāranyaka (ca. 700 BCE), the leading theorist Yājnavalkya states in a passage often referred to by the irreligious: "so I say, after death there is no awareness." In the main work by the "father of linguistics", Panini (ca. 4th c. BCE), the main (Kasika) commentary on his affix regarding nastika explains: "an atheist" is one "whose belief is that there is no Hereafter" (4.4.60). Cārvāka arguments are also present in the oldest Sanskrit epic, Ramayana (early parts from 3rd c. BCE), in which the hero Rama is lectured by the sage Javali – who states that the worship of gods is "laid down in the Shastras by clever people, just to rule over other people and make them submissive and disposed to charity."

The Veda philosopher Adi Shankara (ca 790–820), who consolidated the non-dualist Advaita Vedanta tradition, spends several pages trying to refute the non-religious schools, as he argues against "Unlearned people, and the Lokayatikas (…)"

According to the historian Dag Herbjørnsrud, the atheist Carvaka schools were present at the court of the Muslim-born Mughal ruler, Akbar (1542–1605), an inquiring skeptic who believed in "the pursuit of reason" over "reliance on tradition". When he invited philosophers and representatives of the different religions to his new "House of Worship" (Ibadat Khana) in Fatehpur Sikri, Carvakas were present as well. According to the chronicler Abul Fazl (1551–1602), those discussing religious and existential matters at Akbar's court included the atheists:

They do not believe in a God nor in immaterial substances, and affirm faculty of thought to result from the equilibrium of the aggregate elements (…) They admit only of such sciences as tend to the promotion of external order, that is, a knowledge of just administration and benevolent government. They are somewhat analogous to the sophists in their views and have written many works in reproach of others (…)

Herbjørnsrud argues that the Carvaka schools never disappeared in India, and that the atheist traditions of India influenced Europe from the late 16th century: "The Europeans were surprised by the openness and rational doubts of Akbar and the Indians. In Pierre De Jarric's Histoire (1610), based on the Jesuit reports, the Mughal emperor is actually compared to an atheist himself: “Thus we see in this Prince the common fault of the atheist, who refuses to make reason subservient to faith (…)”

Hannah Chapelle Wojciehowski concludes as follows concerning the Jesuit descriptions in her paper “East-West Swerves: Cārvāka Materialism and Akbar's Religious Debates at Fatehpur Sikri” (2015):

…The information they sent back to Europe was disseminated widely in both Catholic and Protestant countries (…) A more detailed understanding of Indian philosophies, including Cārvāka, began to emerge in Jesuit missionary writings by the early to mid-seventeenth century.

The Jesuit Roberto De Nobili wrote in 1613 that the “Logaidas” (Lokayatas) "hold the view that the elements themselves are god". Some decades later, Heinrich Roth, who studied Sanskrit in Agra ca. 1654–60, translated the Vedantasara by the influential Vedantic commentator Sadananda (14th), a text that depicts four different schools of the Carvaka philosophies. Wojciehowski notes: "Rather than proclaiming a Cārvāka renaissance in Akbar's court, it would be safer to suggest that the ancient school of materialism never really went away."

=== Buddhism ===
Buddhism is sometimes described as nontheistic because of the absence of a creator god, but that can be too simplistic a view. The nonadherence to the notion of a supreme deity or a prime mover is seen by many as a key distinction between Buddhism and other religions. While Buddhist traditions do not deny the existence of supernatural beings (many are discussed in Buddhist scripture), it does not ascribe powers, in the typical Western sense, for creation, salvation or judgement, to the "gods"; however, praying to enlightened deities is sometimes seen as leading to some degree of spiritual merit.

Buddhists accept the existence of beings in higher realms, known as devas, but they, like humans, are said to be suffering in samsara, and not particularly wiser than we are. In fact the Buddha is often portrayed as a teacher of the deities, and superior to them.

=== Jainism ===
Jains see their tradition as eternal. Organized Jainism can be dated back to Mahavira, a teacher of the sixth century BCE, and a contemporary of the Buddha. Jainism is a dualistic religion with the universe made up of matter and souls. The universe, and the matter and souls within it, is eternal and uncreated, and there is no omnipotent creator deity in Jainism. There are, however, "gods" and other spirits who exist within the universe and Jains believe that the soul can attain "godhood"; however, none of these supernatural beings exercise any sort of creative activity or have the capacity or ability to intervene in answers to prayers.

== Classical Greece and Rome ==
In Western classical antiquity, theism was the fundamental belief that supported the legitimacy of the state (the polis, later the Roman Empire). Historically, any person who did not believe in any deity supported by the state was fair game to accusations of atheism, a capital crime. Charges of atheism (meaning any subversion of religion) were often used similarly to charges of heresy and impiety as a political tool to eliminate enemies. Early Christians were widely reviled as atheists because they did not participate in the cults of the Greco-Roman gods. During the Roman Empire, Christians were executed for their rejection of the pagan deities in general and the Imperial cult of ancient Rome in particular.

=== Philosophy ===
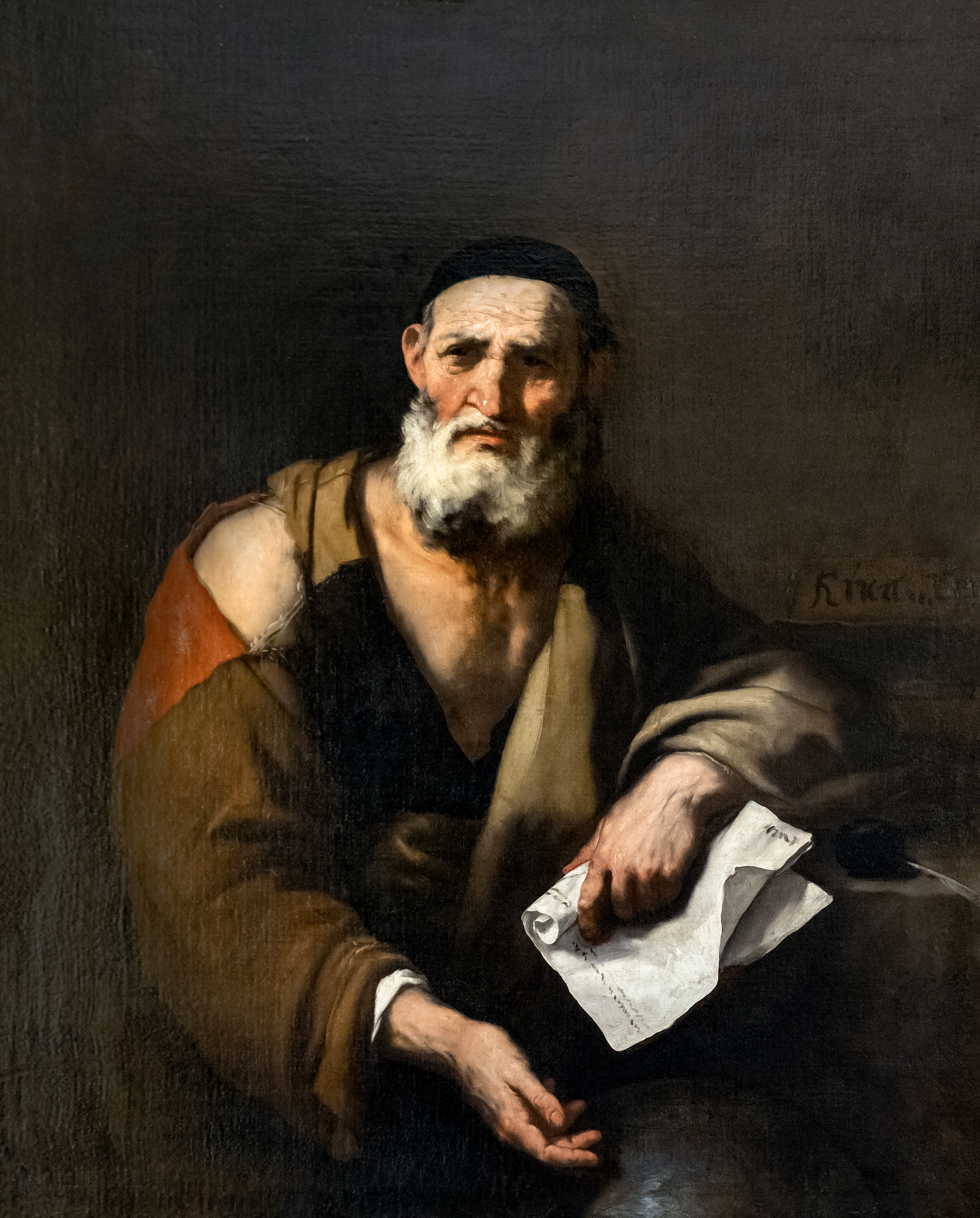
Leucippus, painting by Luca Giordano

The roots of Western philosophy began in the Greek world in the sixth century BCE. The first Hellenic philosophers were not atheists, but they attempted to explain the world in terms of the processes of nature instead of by mythological accounts. Thus lightning was the result of "wind breaking out and parting the clouds", and earthquakes occurred when "the earth is considerably altered by heating and cooling". The early philosophers often criticized traditional religious notions. Xenophanes (6th century BCE) famously said that if cows and horses had hands, "then horses would draw the forms of gods like horses, and cows like cows". Another philosopher, Anaxagoras (5th century BCE), claimed that the Sun was "a fiery mass, larger than the Peloponnese"; a charge of impiety was brought against him, and he was forced to flee Athens.

The first fully materialistic philosophy was produced by the atomists Leucippus and Democritus (5th century BCE), who attempted to explain the formation and development of the world in terms of the chance movements of atoms moving in infinite space.

For political reasons, Socrates was accused of being atheos ("refusing to acknowledge the gods recognized by the state"). The Athenian public associated Socrates (c. 470–399 BCE) with the trends in pre-Socratic philosophy towards naturalistic inquiry and the rejection of divine explanations for phenomena. Aristophanes' comic play The Clouds (performed 423 BCE) portrayed Socrates as teaching his students that the traditional Greek deities did not exist. Socrates was later tried and executed under the charge of not believing in the gods of the state and instead worshipping foreign gods. Socrates himself vehemently denied the charges of atheism at his trial. All the surviving sources about him indicate that he was a very devout man, who prayed to the rising sun and believed that the oracle at Delphi spoke the word of Apollo.

While only a few of the ancient Greco-Roman schools of philosophy were subject to accusations of atheism, there were some individual philosophers who espoused atheist views. The Peripatetic philosopher Strato of Lampsacus did not believe in the existence of gods. The Cyrenaic philosopher Theodorus the Atheist (c. 300 BCE) is supposed to have denied that gods exist and wrote a book On the Gods expounding his views.

==== The Sophists ====
In the fifth century BCE the Sophists began to question many of the traditional assumptions of Greek culture. Prodicus of Ceos was said to have believed that "it was the things which were serviceable to human life that had been regarded as gods", and Protagoras stated at the beginning of a book that "With regard to the gods I am unable to say either that they exist or do not exist". Diagoras of Melos allegedly chopped up a wooden statue of Heracles and used it to roast his lentils and revealed the secrets of the Eleusinian Mysteries. The Athenians accused him of impiety and banished him from their city. Critias was said as well to deny that the gods existed.

Aristophanes (c. 448–380 BCE), known for his satirical style, wrote in his play the Knights: "Shrines! Shrines! Surely you don't believe in the gods. What's your argument? Where's your proof?"

Euripides (c. 480-406 BCE), a Greek tragedy author, depicts the Greek hero Bellerophon in his eponymous play as a pessimist who eventually believes the gods do not exist: “Is there anyone who thinks there are gods in heaven? / There are not. There are not, for any man who wishes / Not to be a fool and trust some ancient story..."

==== Epicureanism ====
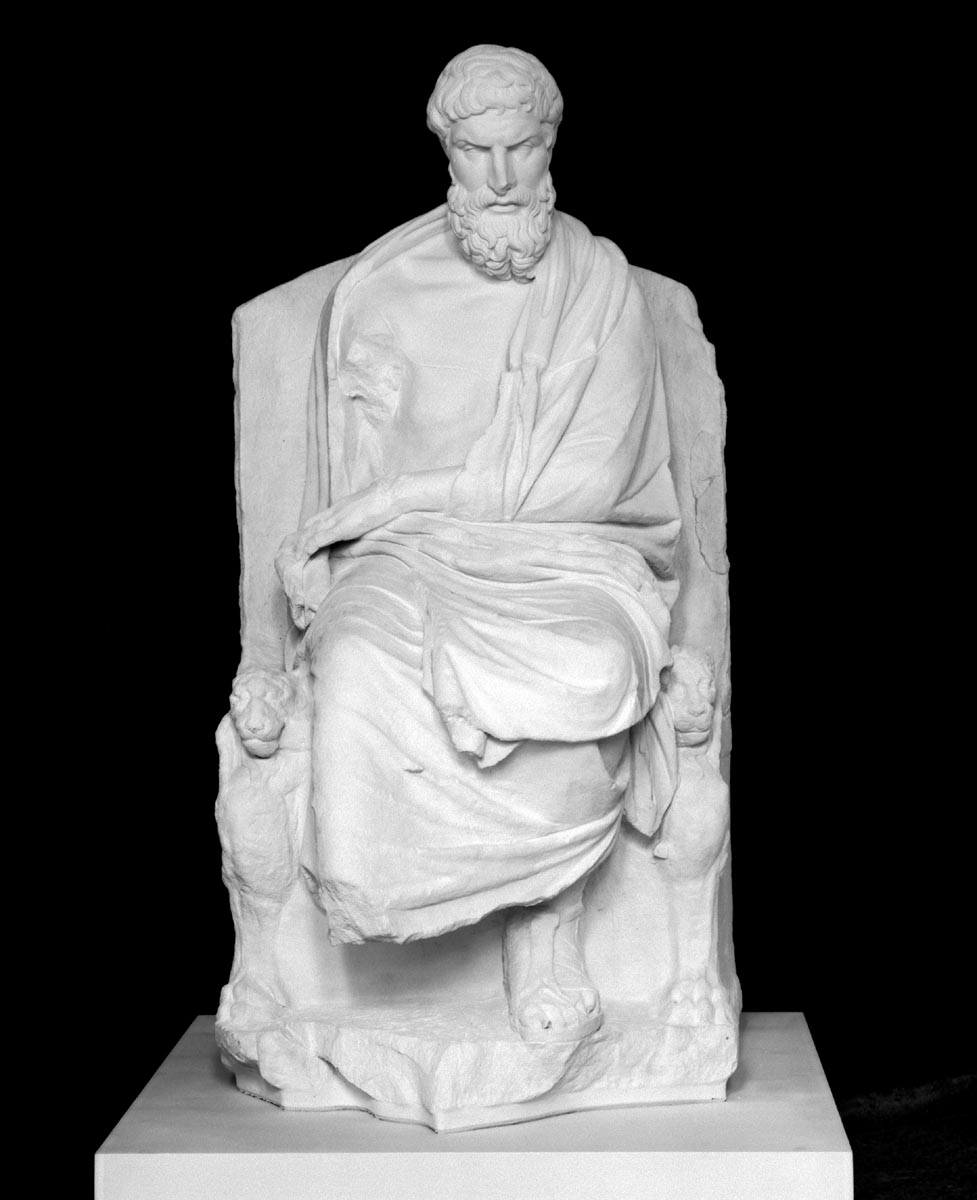
Epicurus

The most important Greek thinker in the development of atheism was Epicurus (c. 300 BCE). Drawing on the ideas of Democritus and the Atomists, he espoused a materialistic philosophy according to which the universe was governed by the laws of chance without the need for divine intervention (see scientific determinism). Although Epicurus still maintained that the gods existed, he believed that they were uninterested in human affairs. The aim of the Epicureans was to attain ataraxia (a mental state of being untroubled). One important way of doing this was by exposing fear of divine wrath as irrational. The Epicureans also denied the existence of an afterlife and the need to fear divine punishment after death.

One of the most eloquent expressions of Epicurean thought is Lucretius' On the Nature of Things (1st century BCE) in which he held that gods exist but argued that religious fear was one of the chief causes of human unhappiness and that the gods did not involve themselves in the world. The Epicureans also denied the existence of an afterlife and hence dismissed the fear of death.

Epicureans denied being atheists but their critics insisted they were. One explanation for this alleged crypto-atheism is that they feared persecution, and while they avoided this their teachings were controversial and harshly attacked by some of the other schools, particularly Stoicism and Neoplatonism.

==== Pyrrhonism ====
Similar to the Epicureans, the Pyrrhonists employed a tactic to avoid persecution for atheism in which they, in conformity with ancestral customs and laws, declared that the gods exist, and performed everything which contributes to their worship and veneration, but, with regard to philosophy, declined to commit themselves to the gods' existence. The Pyrrhonist philosopher Sextus Empiricus compiled a large number of ancient arguments against the existence of gods, recommending that one should suspend judgment regarding the matter. His large volume of surviving works had a lasting influence on later philosophers.

=== Medicine ===
In pre-Hippocratic times, Greeks believed that gods controlled all aspects of human existence, including health and disease. One of the earliest works that challenged the religious view was On the Sacred Disease, written about 400 B.C. The anonymous author argued that the "sacred disease" of epilepsy has a natural cause, and that the idea of its supposed divine origin is based on human inexperience.

=== Euhemerus ===
Euhemerus (c. 330–260 BCE) published his view that the gods were only the deified rulers, conquerors, and founders of the past, and that their cults and religions were in essence the continuation of vanished kingdoms and earlier political structures. Although Euhemerus was later criticized for having "spread atheism over the whole inhabited earth by obliterating the gods", his worldview was not atheist in a strict and theoretical sense, because he differentiated them from the primordial deities, holding that they were "eternal and imperishable". Some historians have argued that he merely aimed at reinventing the old religions in the light of the beginning of deification of political rulers such as Alexander the Great.

== The Middle Ages ==
=== Islamic world ===
In the early history of Islam, Muslim scholars recognized the idea of atheism and frequently attacked unbelievers, although they were unable to name any atheists. When individuals were accused of atheism, they were usually viewed as heretics rather than proponents of atheism. However, there were freethinkers and outspoken critics of the Islamic religion such as deists, philosophers, rationalists, and atheists in the medieval Islamic world. One notable figure was the 9th-century scholar Ibn al-Rawandi, who criticized the notion of religious prophecy, including that of Muhammad, and maintained that religious dogmas were not acceptable to reason and must be rejected. Other critics of religion in the Islamic world include the poet Al-Maʿarri (973–1057), the scholar Abu Isa al-Warraq (fl. 9th century), and the physician and philosopher Abu Bakr al-Razi (865–925). However, al-Razi's atheism may have been "deliberately misdescribed" by an Ismaili missionary named Abu Hatim. Al-Maʿarri wrote and taught that religion itself was a "fable invented by the ancients" and that humans were "of two sorts: those with brains, but no religion, and those with religion, but no brains."

=== Europe ===
The titular character of the Icelandic saga, Hrafnkell, written in the late thirteenth century, says, "I think it is folly to have faith in gods". After his temple to Freyr is burnt and he is enslaved, he vows never to perform another sacrifice, a position described in the sagas as goðlauss, "godless". Jacob Grimm in his Teutonic Mythology observes,

It is remarkable that Old Norse legend occasionally mentions certain men who, turning away in utter disgust and doubt from the heathen faith, placed their reliance on their own strength and virtue. Thus in the Sôlar lioð 17 we read of Vêbogi and Râdey â sik þau trûðu, "in themselves they trusted",

citing several other examples, including two kings. Subsequent to Grimm's investigation, scholars including J. R. R. Tolkien and E.O.G. Turville-Petre have identified the goðlauss ethic as a stream of atheistic and/or humanistic philosophy in the Icelandic sagas. People described as goðlauss expressed not only a lack of faith in deities, but also a pragmatic belief in their own faculties of strength, reason and virtue and in social codes of honor independent of any supernatural agency.

Another phenomenon in the Middle Ages was proofs of the existence of God. Both Anselm of Canterbury, and later, William of Ockham acknowledged adversaries who doubted the existence of God. Thomas Aquinas' five proofs of God's existence and Anselm's ontological argument implicitly acknowledged the validity of the question about God's existence. Frederick Copleston, however, explains that Thomas laid out his proofs not to counter atheism, but to address certain early Christian writers such as John of Damascus, who asserted that knowledge of God's existence was naturally innate in man, based on his natural desire for happiness. Thomas stated that although there is desire for happiness which forms the basis for a proof of God's existence in man, further reflection is required to understand that this desire is only fulfilled in God, not for example in wealth or sensual pleasure. However, Aquinas's Five Ways also address (hypothetical) atheist arguments citing evil in the universe and claiming that God's existence is unnecessary to explain things. See also Summa Theologica.

The charge of atheism was used to attack political or religious opponents. Pope Boniface VIII, because he insisted on the political supremacy of the church, was accused by his enemies after his death of holding (unlikely) positions such as "neither believing in the immortality nor incorruptibility of the soul, nor in a life to come". Sects deemed heretical such as the Waldensians were also accused of being atheistic.

John Arnold's 2005 Belief and Unbelief in Medieval Europe discusses individuals who were indifferent to the Church and did not participate in faith practices. Arnold notes that while these examples could be perceived as simply people being lazy, it demonstrates that "belief was not universally fervent". Arnold enumerates examples of people not attending church, and even those who excluded the Church from their marriage. Disbelief, Arnold argues, stemmed from boredom. Arnold argues that while some blasphemy implies the existence of God, laws demonstrate that there were also cases of blasphemy that directly attacked articles of faith. Italian preachers in the fourteenth century also warned of unbelievers and people who lacked belief.

== Renaissance and Reformation ==
During the time of the Renaissance and the Reformation, criticism of the religious establishment became more frequent in predominantly Christian countries, but did not amount to atheism, per se.

The term athéisme was coined in France in the sixteenth century. The word "atheist" appears in English books at least as early as 1566. The concept of atheism re-emerged initially as a reaction to the intellectual and religious turmoil of the Age of Enlightenment and the Reformation, as a charge used by those who saw the denial of god and godlessness in the controversial positions being put forward by others. During the sixteenth and seventeenth centuries, the word 'atheist' was used exclusively as an insult; nobody wanted to be regarded as an atheist. Although one overtly atheistic compendium known as the Theophrastus redivivus was published by an anonymous author in the seventeenth century, atheism was an epithet implying a lack of moral restraint.

According to Geoffrey Blainey, the Reformation in Europe had paved the way for atheists by attacking the authority of the Catholic Church, which in turn "quietly inspired other thinkers to attack the authority of the new Protestant churches". Deism gained influence in France, Prussia and England, and proffered belief in a noninterventionist deity, but "while some deists were atheists in disguise, most were religious, and by today's standards would be called true believers". The scientific and mathematical discoveries of such as Copernicus, Newton and Descartes sketched a pattern of natural laws that lent weight to this new outlook.

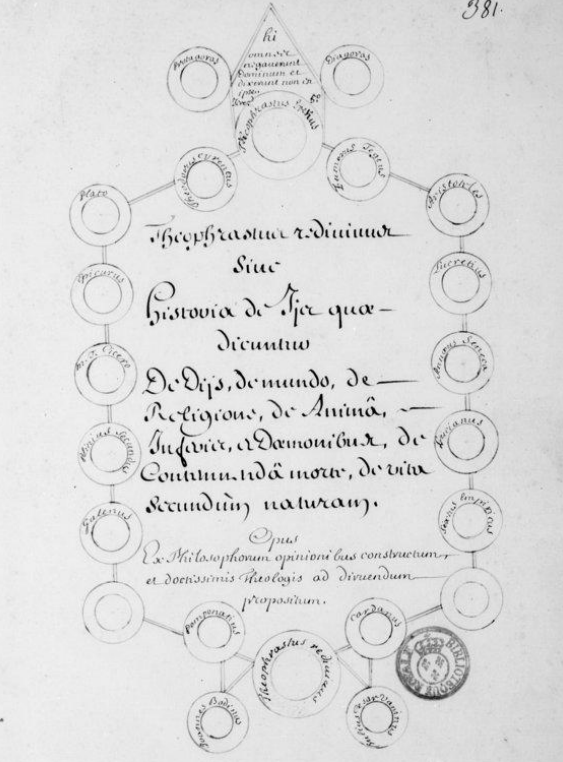
Theophrastus redivivus, 17th century

How dangerous it was to be accused of being an atheist at this time is illustrated by the examples of Étienne Dolet, who was strangled and burned in 1546. The English philosopher Thomas Hobbes (1588–1679) was also accused of atheism, but he denied it. His theism was unusual, in that he held god to be material. Even earlier, the British playwright and poet Christopher Marlowe (1563–1593) was accused of atheism when a tract denying the divinity of Christ was found in his home. Before he could finish defending himself against the charge, Marlowe was murdered. Giulio Cesare Vanini, also accused of being an atheist, was burned at the stake in 1619.

Blainey wrote that the Dutch philosopher Baruch Spinoza was "probably the first well known 'semi-atheist' to announce himself in a Christian land in the modern era", although nowhere in his work does Spinoza argue against the existence of God. It is a widespread belief that Spinoza equated God with the material universe and so his beliefs have been categorized as Pantheist. Spinoza had been expelled from his synagogue for his protests against the teachings of its rabbis and for failing to attend Saturday services. He believed that God did not interfere in the running of the world, but rather that natural laws explained the workings of the universe. In 1661 he published his Short Treatise on God, but he was not a popular figure for the first century following his death: "An unbeliever was expected to be a rebel in almost everything and wicked in all his ways", wrote Blainey, "but here was a virtuous one. He lived the good life and made his living in a useful way. . . . It took courage to be a Spinoza or even one of his supporters. If a handful of scholars agreed with his writings, they did not so say in public".

In early modern times, the first explicit atheist known by name was the German-languaged Danish critic of religion Matthias Knutzen (1646–after 1674), who published three atheist writings in 1674. Knutzen was called "The only person on record who openly professed and taught atheism" in the 1789 Students Pocket Dictionary of Universal History by Thomas Mortimer.

In 1689 the Polish nobleman Kazimierz Łyszczyński, who had denied the existence of God in his philosophical treatise De non-existentia Dei, was imprisoned unlawfully; despite Warsaw Confederation tradition and King Sobieski's intercession, Łyszczyński was condemned to death for atheism and beheaded in Warsaw after his tongue was pulled out with a burning iron and his hands slowly burned. In De non-existentia Dei he had demonstrated strong atheism:

II – the Man is a creator of God, and God is a concept and creation of a Man. Hence the people are architects and engineers of God and God is not a true being, but a being existing only within mind, being chimaeric by its nature, because a God and a chimaera are the same. IV – simple folk are cheated by the more cunning with the fabrication of God for their own oppression; whereas the same oppression is shielded by the folk in a way, that if the wise attempted to free them by the truth, they would be quelled by the very people.

== The Age of Enlightenment ==
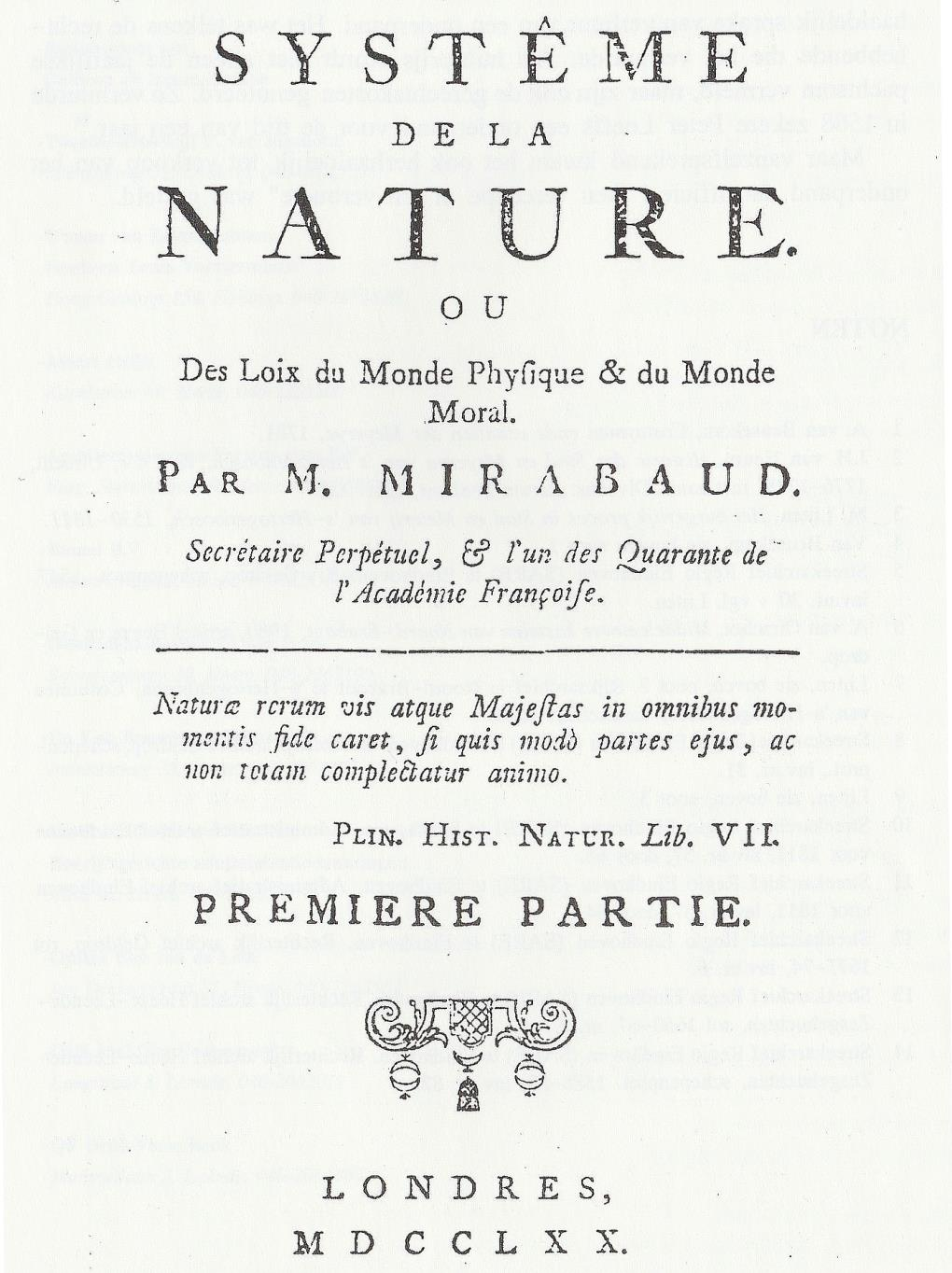
Baron d'Holbach, The System of Nature, 1770

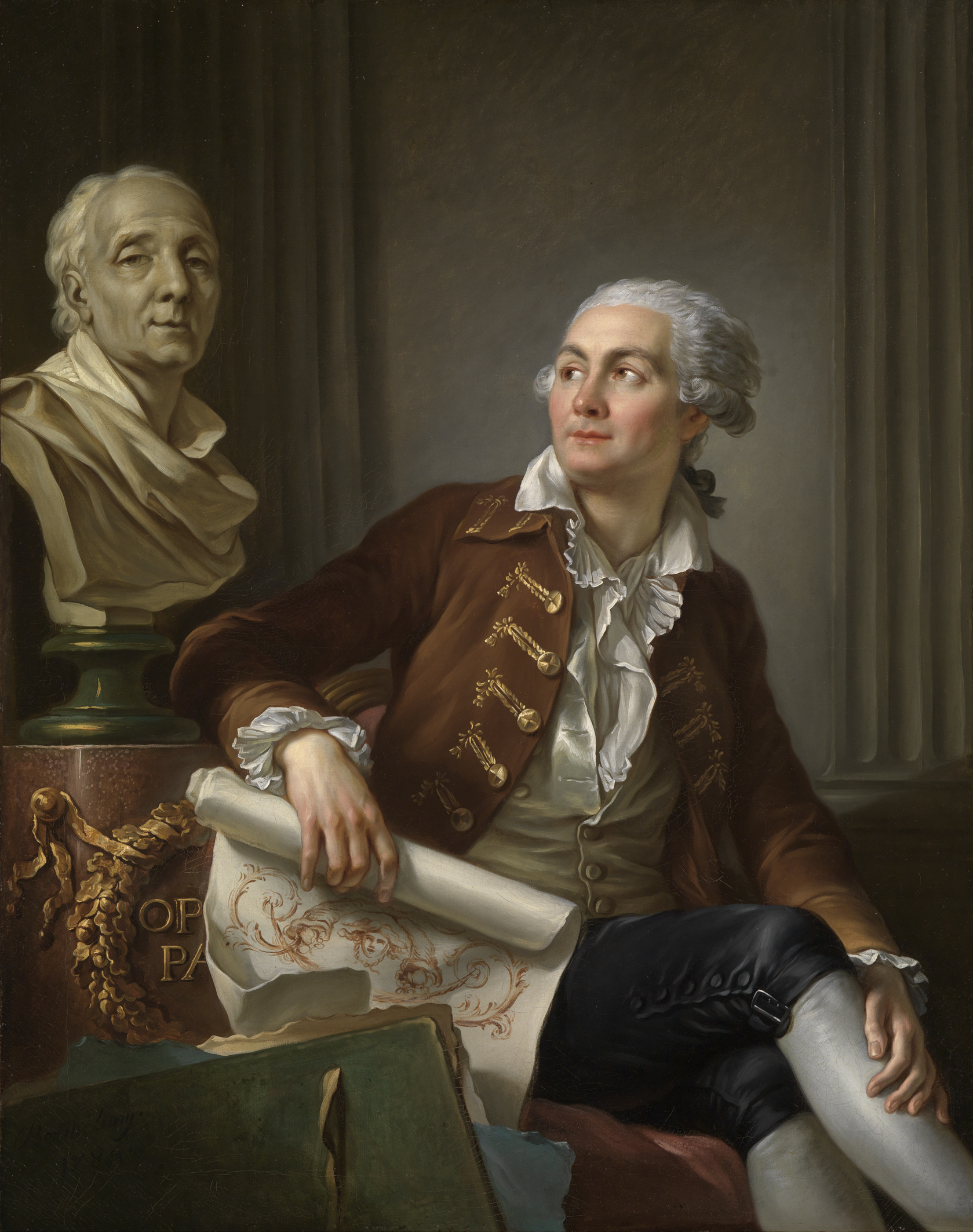
Jean-Simon Berthélemy, Portrait of man with Bust of Denis Diderot, 1784

While not gaining converts from large portions of the population, versions of deism became influential in certain intellectual circles. Jean Jacques Rousseau challenged the Christian notion that human beings had been tainted by sin, and instead proposed that humans were originally good, only later to be corrupted by civilization. The influential figure of Voltaire spread deistic notions to a wide audience. "After the French Revolution and its outbursts of atheism, Voltaire was widely condemned as one of the causes", wrote Blainey, "Nonetheless, his writings did concede that fear of God was an essential policeman in a disorderly world: 'If God did not exist, it would be necessary to invent him', wrote Voltaire". Voltaire's assertion occurs in his Épître à l'Auteur du Livre des Trois Imposteurs, written in response to the Treatise of the Three Impostors, a document (most likely) authored by John Toland that denied all three Abrahamic religions. In 1766, Voltaire tried unsuccessfully to have the judgment reversed in the case of the French nobleman François-Jean de la Barre who was tortured, beheaded, and his body burned for alleged vandalism of a crucifix.

Arguably the first book in modern times solely dedicated to promoting atheism was written by French Catholic priest Jean Meslier (1664–1729), whose posthumously published lengthy philosophical essay (part of the original title: Thoughts and Feelings of Jean Meslier ... Clear and Evident Demonstrations of the Vanity and Falsity of All the Religions of the World) rejects the concept of God (both in the Christian and also in the Deistic sense), the soul, miracles and the discipline of theology. Philosopher Michel Onfray states that Meslier's work marks the beginning of "the history of true atheism".

By the 1770s, atheism in some predominantly Christian countries was ceasing to be a dangerous accusation that required denial, and was evolving into a position openly avowed by some. The first open denial of the existence of God and avowal of atheism since classical times may be that of Baron d'Holbach (1723–1789) in his 1770 work, The System of Nature. D'Holbach was a Parisian social figure who conducted a famous salon widely attended by many intellectual notables of the day, including Denis Diderot, Jean-Jacques Rousseau, David Hume, Adam Smith, and Benjamin Franklin. Nevertheless, his book was published under a pseudonym, and was banned and publicly burned by the executioner. Diderot, one of the Enlightenment's most prominent philosophes and editor-in-chief of the Encyclopédie, which sought to challenge religious, particularly Catholic, dogma said, "Reason is to the estimation of the philosophe what grace is to the Christian", he wrote. "Grace determines the Christian's action; reason the philosophe's". Diderot was briefly imprisoned for his writing, some of which was banned and burned.

In Scotland, David Hume produced a six volume history of England in 1754, which gave little attention to God. He implied that if God existed he was impotent in the face of European upheaval. Hume ridiculed miracles, but walked a careful line so as to avoid being too dismissive of Christianity. With Hume's presence, Edinburgh gained a reputation as a "haven of atheism", alarming many ordinary Britons.

The culte de la Raison developed during the uncertain period 1792–94 (Years I through III of the Republic), following the September massacres, when Revolutionary France was rife with fears of internal and foreign enemies. Several Parisian churches were transformed into Temples of Reason, notably the Church of Saint-Paul Saint-Louis in the Marais. The churches were closed in May 1793 and more securely 24 November 1793, when the Catholic Mass was forbidden.

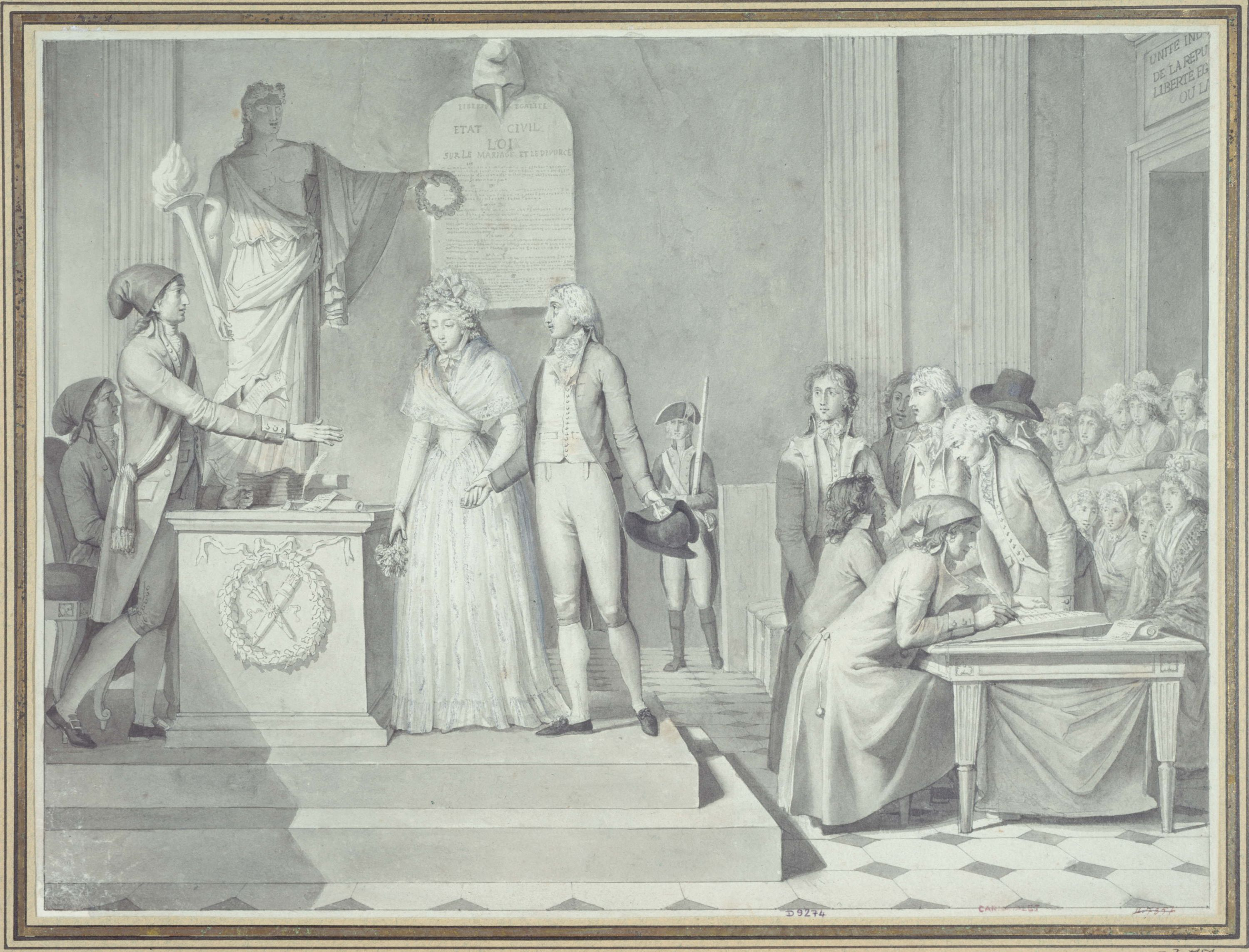
Civil marriage became possible after the French Revolution.

Blainey wrote that "atheism seized the pedestal in revolutionary France in the 1790s. The secular symbols replaced the cross. In the cathedral of Notre Dame the altar, the holy place, was converted into a monument to Reason..." During the Terror of 1792–93, France's Christian calendar was abolished, monasteries, convents and church properties were seized and monks and nuns expelled. Historic churches were dismantled. The Cult of Reason was a creed based on atheism devised during the French Revolution by Jacques Hébert, Pierre Gaspard Chaumette, and their supporters. It was stopped by Maximilien Robespierre, a Deist, who instituted the Cult of the Supreme Being. Both cults were the outcome of the "de-Christianization" of French society during the Revolution and part of the Reign of Terror.

The Cult of Reason was celebrated in a carnival atmosphere of parades, ransacking of churches, ceremonious iconoclasm, in which religious and royal images were defaced, and ceremonies which substituted the "martyrs of the Revolution" for Christian martyrs. The earliest public demonstrations took place en province, outside Paris, notably by Hébertists in Lyon, but took a further radical turn with the Fête de la Liberté ("Festival of Liberty") at Notre Dame de Paris, 10 November (20 Brumaire) 1793, in ceremonies devised and organised by Pierre-Gaspard Chaumette.

The pamphlet Answer to Dr. Priestley's Letters to a Philosophical Unbeliever (1782) is considered to be the first published declaration of atheism in Britain—plausibly the first in English (as distinct from covert or cryptically atheist works). The otherwise unknown William Hammon (possibly a pseudonym) signed the preface and postscript as editor of the work, and the anonymous main text is attributed to Matthew Turner (d. 1788?), a Liverpool physician who may have known Priestley. Historian of atheism David Berman has argued strongly for Turner's authorship, but also suggested that there may have been two authors.

== Modern history ==
=== Nineteenth century ===
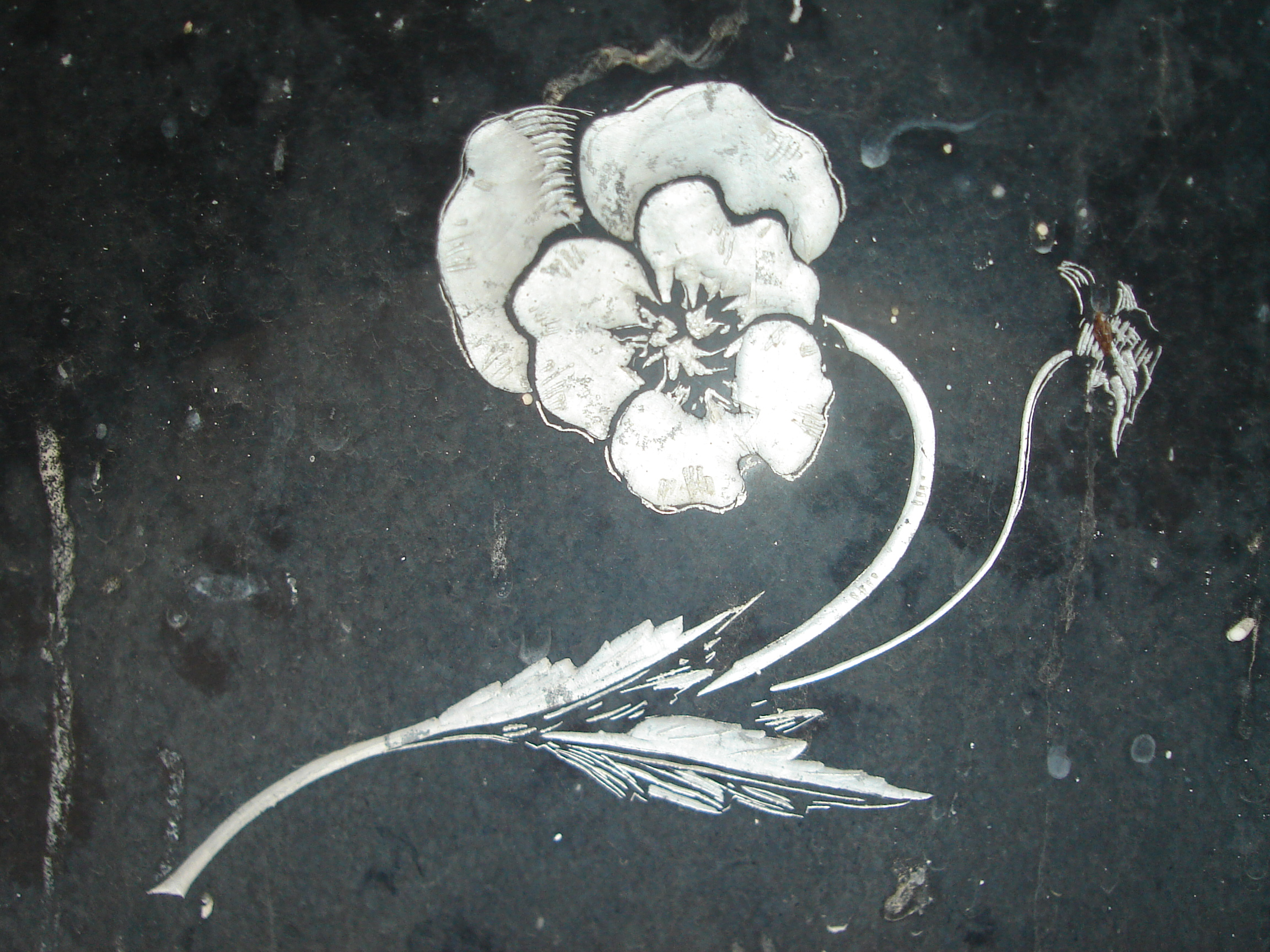
Pansy is a symbol of freethought. Tombstone detail, late 19th century.

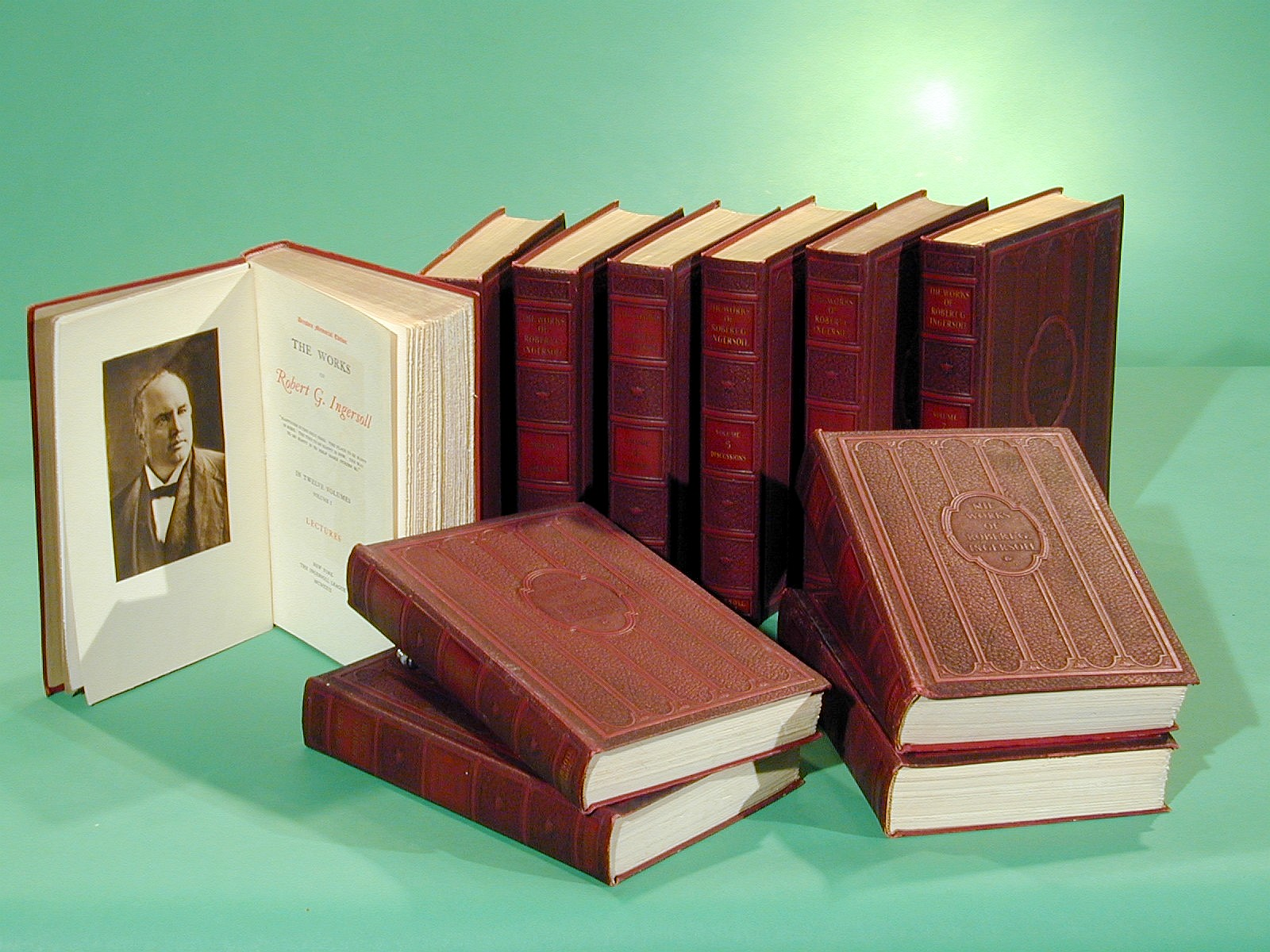
Collected works of American secularist and freethinker Robert G. Ingersoll

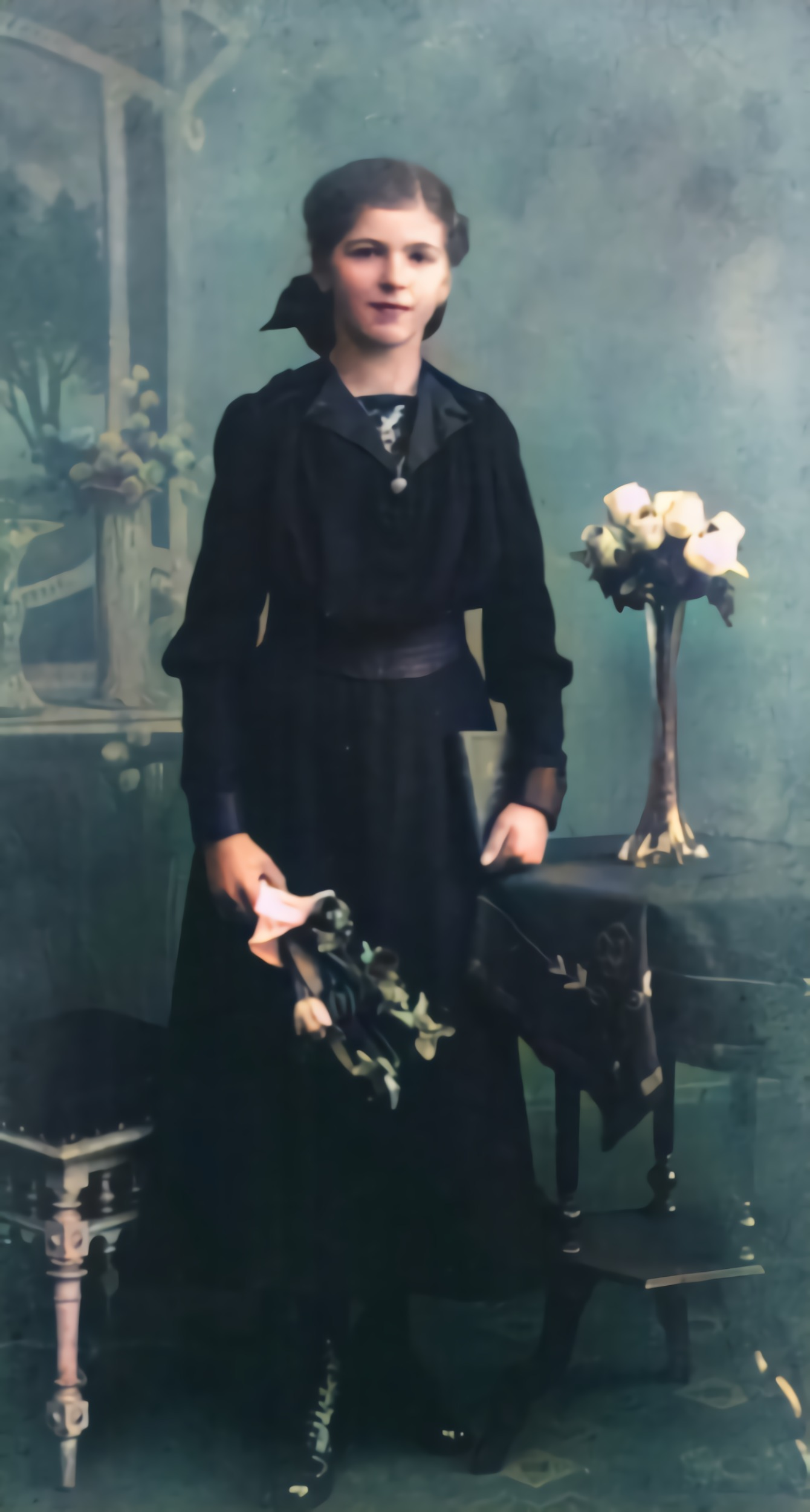
A young woman completing Jugendweihe in Germany around 1900

The French Revolution of 1789 catapulted atheistic thought into political notability in some Western countries, and opened the way for the nineteenth century movements of rationalism, freethought, and liberalism. Born in 1792, Romantic poet Percy Bysshe Shelley, a child of the Age of Enlightenment, was expelled from England's Oxford University in 1811 for submitting to the Dean an anonymous pamphlet that he wrote entitled, The Necessity of Atheism. This pamphlet is considered by scholars as the first atheistic tract published in the English language. An early atheistic influence in Germany was The Essence of Christianity by Ludwig Feuerbach (1804–1872). He influenced other German nineteenth century atheistic thinkers like Karl Marx, Max Stirner, Arthur Schopenhauer (1788–1860), and Friedrich Nietzsche (1844–1900).

The freethinker Charles Bradlaugh (1833–1891) was repeatedly elected to the British Parliament, but was not allowed to take his seat after his request to affirm rather than take the religious oath was turned down (he then offered to take the oath, but this too was denied him). After Bradlaugh was re-elected for the fourth time, a new Speaker allowed Bradlaugh to take the oath and permitted no objections. He became the first outspoken atheist to sit in Parliament, where he participated in amending the Oaths Act.

In 1844, Karl Marx (1818–1883), an atheistic political economist, wrote in his Contribution to the Critique of Hegel's Philosophy of Right: "Religious suffering is, at one and the same time, the expression of real suffering and a protest against real suffering. Religion is the sigh of the oppressed creature, the heart of a heartless world, and the soul of soulless conditions. It is the opium of the people." Marx believed that people turn to religion in order to dull the pain caused by the reality of social situations; that is, Marx suggests religion is an attempt at transcending the material state of affairs in a society—the pain of class oppression—by effectively creating a dream world, rendering the religious believer amenable to social control and exploitation in this world while they hope for relief and justice in life after death. In the same essay, Marx states, "[m]an creates religion, religion does not create man".

Friedrich Nietzsche, a prominent atheist philosopher, is well known for coining the aphorism "God is dead" (German: "Gott ist tot"); incidentally the phrase was not spoken by Nietzsche directly, but was used as a dialogue for the characters in his works. Nietzsche argued that Christian theism as a belief system had been a moral foundation of the Western world, and that the rejection and collapse of this foundation as a result of modern thinking (the death of God) would naturally cause a rise in nihilism or the lack of values. He called for a re-evaluation of old values and a creation of new ones, hoping that in doing so humans would achieve a higher state he labeled the Overman (Übermensch).

Atheist feminism also began in the nineteenth century. Atheist feminists oppose religion as a main source of female oppression and gender inequality, believing that the majority of religions are sexist and oppressive to women.

=== Twentieth century ===
==== The spread of atheism ====
Atheism in the twentieth century found recognition in a wide variety of other, broader philosophies in the Western tradition, such as logical positivism, Marxism, anarchism, existentialism, secular humanism, objectivism, feminism, and the general scientific and rationalist movement. Neopositivism and analytical philosophy discarded classical rationalism and metaphysics in favor of empiricism. Proponents such as Bertrand Russell emphatically rejected belief in God.

A. J. Ayer asserted the unverifiability and meaninglessness of religious statements, citing his adherence to the empirical sciences. J. N. Findlay and J. J. C. Smart argued against the existence of God. Naturalists and materialists such as John Dewey considered the natural world to be the basis of everything.

==== State atheism ====
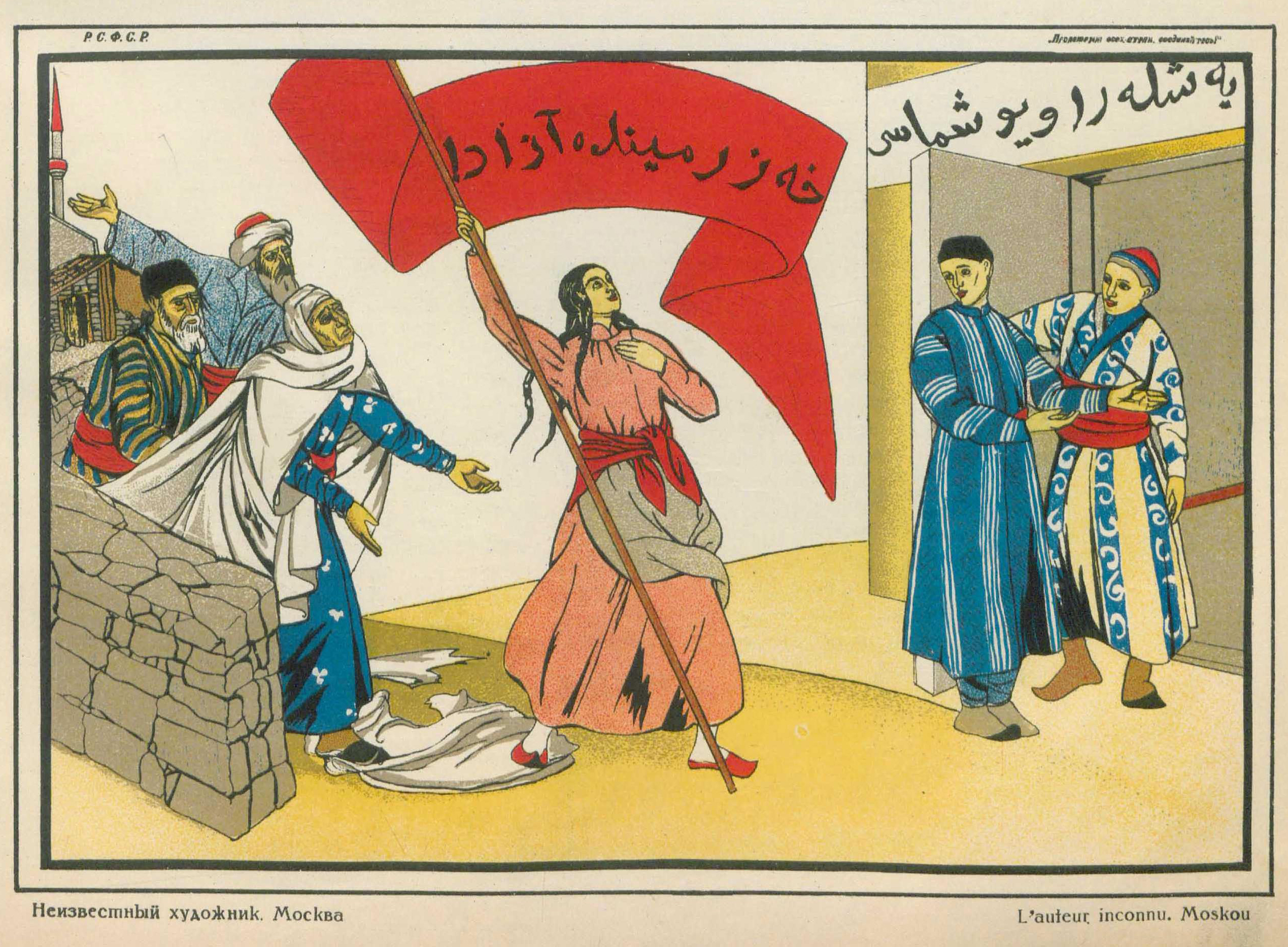
"I am free now´too!" A poster encouraging young women of Soviet Turkestan to join the Komsomol

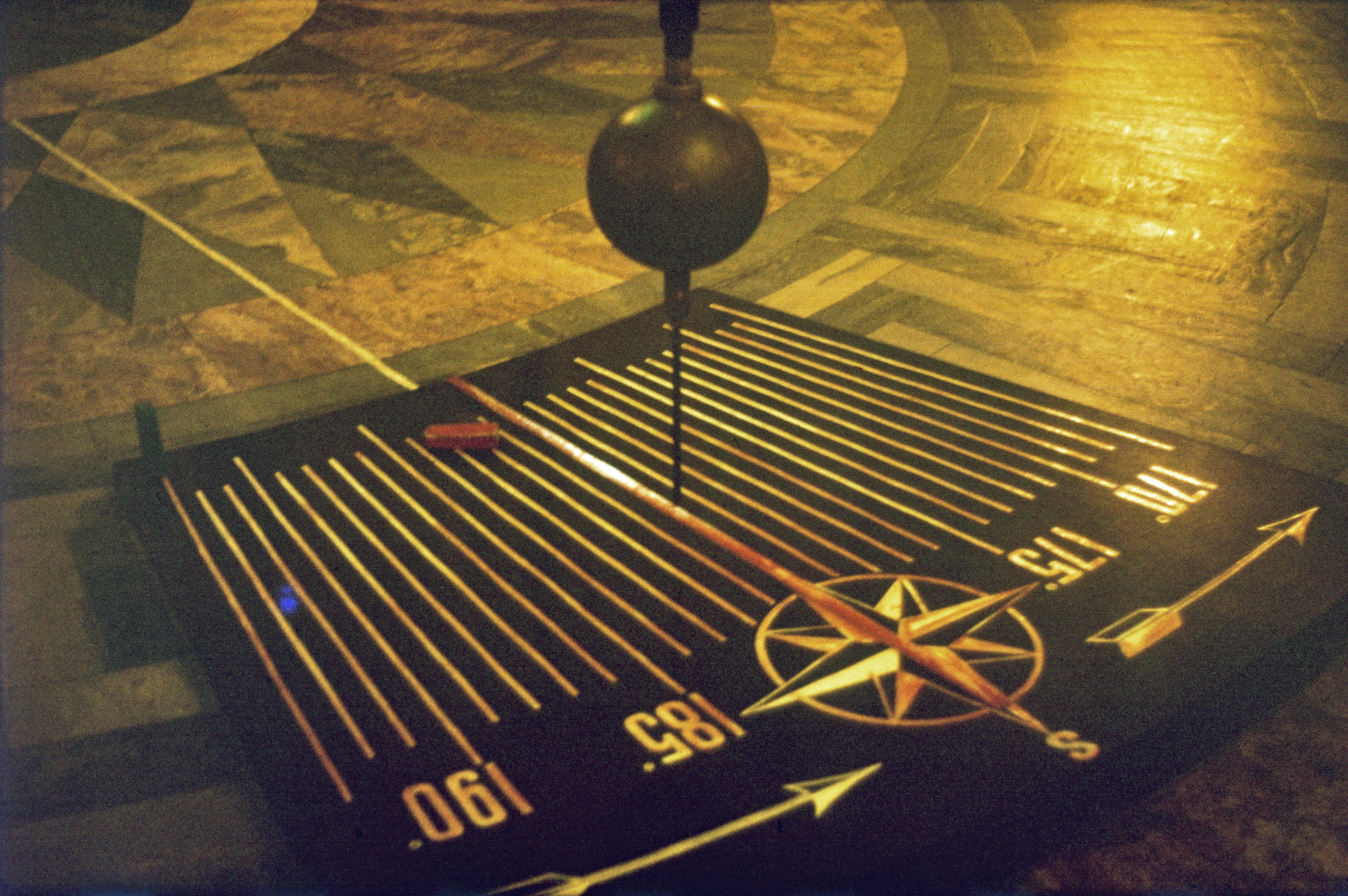
The Foucault pendulum inside the cathedral in USSR

The Russian Orthodox Church was suppressed by the Soviet government. In 1922, the Soviet regime arrested the Patriarch of the Russian Orthodox Church. Following the death of Vladimir Lenin, with his rejection of religious authority as a tool of oppression and his strategy of "patently explain," Soviet leader Joseph Stalin pursued the persecution of the church through the 1920s and 1930s. Many priests were killed and imprisoned. Thousands of churches were closed, some turned into hospitals. In 1925 the government founded the League of Militant Atheists. The regime relented in its persecution following the Nazi invasion of the Soviet Union in 1941. Stalin re-opened Russia's churches to steel the Soviet population in the battle against Germany.

The central figure in Italian Fascism was Benito Mussolini. In his early career, Mussolini was an atheist and a strident opponent of the Church, and the first Fascist program, written in 1919, had called for the secularization of Church property in Italy. Mussolini later moderated his stance, and in office, permitted the teaching of religion in schools and came to terms with the Papacy in the Lateran Treaty. Pope Pius XI condemned Mussolini's Fascist movement's "pagan worship of the State" and "revolution which snatches the young from the Church and from Jesus Christ" in his encyclical in 1931.

Nazi Germany held a range of views on religion. Hitler's movement said it endorsed a form of Christianity stripped of its Jewish origins and certain key doctrines such as belief in the divinity of Christ. In practice, however, the Nazi regime worked to reduce the influence of Christianity in Germany, seeing it as a barrier to their taking over associations and schools belonging to the churches as part of their path of total control over society. Richard J. Evans wrote that "Hitler emphasised again and again his belief that Nazism was a secular ideology founded on modern science. Science, he declared, would easily destroy the last remaining vestiges of superstition ... 'In the long run', [Hitler] concluded in July 1941, 'National Socialism and religion will no longer be able to exist together' [... The ideal solution would be to leave the religions to devour themselves, without persecutions'".

The majority of Nazi Party members did not leave their churches. Evans wrote that, by 1939, 95 percent of Germans still called themselves Protestant or Catholic, while 3.5 percent were gottgläubig (lit. "believing in god") and 1.5 percent atheist. Most in these latter categories were "convinced Nazis who had left their Church at the behest of the Party, which had been trying since the mid 1930s to reduce the influence of Christianity in society". The majority of the three million Nazi Party members continued to pay their church taxes and register as either Roman Catholic or Evangelical Protestant Christians. Gottgläubig was a nondenominational Nazified outlook on god beliefs, often described as predominantly based on creationist and deistic views. Heinrich Himmler was a strong promoter of the gottgläubig movement and did not allow atheists into the SS, arguing that their "refusal to acknowledge higher powers" would be a "potential source of indiscipline".

Across Eastern Europe following World War II, new Communist states were hostile to religion. Persecutions of religious leaders followed. Nearly all schools of the churches and many of the church buildings were closed, children were taught atheism, and clergy were imprisoned by the thousands. Albania under Enver Hoxha became in 1967 a formally declared atheist state, the only such as of 2022, going far beyond what most other countries had attempted—completely prohibiting religious observance and systematically repressing and persecuting adherents. Article 37 of the Albanian Constitution of 1976 stipulated, "The state recognizes no religion, and supports atheistic propaganda in order to implant a scientific materialistic world outlook in people."

Further post-war communist victories in the East saw religion purged by regimes across China, North Korea and much of Indo-China. In 1949, mainland China became a Communist state under the leadership of Mao Zedong's Chinese Communist Party. Under Mao, China became officially atheist, and though some religious practices were permitted to continue under state supervision, religious groups deemed a threat to order have been suppressed — as with Tibetan Buddhism from 1959 and Falun Gong in the 21st century. Religious schools and social institutions were closed, foreign missionaries expelled, and local religious practices discouraged. During the Cultural Revolution, Mao instigated "struggles" against the Four Olds: "old ideas, customs, culture, and habits of mind". In 1999, the Communist Party launched a three-year drive to promote atheism in Tibet, saying intensifying propaganda on atheism is "especially important for Tibet because atheism plays an extremely important role in promoting economic construction, social advancement and socialist spiritual civilization in the region". According to Encyclopædia Britannica in 2022, around half of the population claimed to be nonreligious or atheist.

==== Secularism ====
Athena Salman speech in American Atheists 2017 National Convention

In India, E. V. Ramasami (Periyar), a prominent atheist leader, fought against Hinduism and the Brahmins for discriminating and dividing people in the name of caste and religion.

During the Cold War, United States often characterized its opponents as "godless communists," which tended to reinforce the view that atheists were unreliable and unpatriotic. Against this background, the words "under God" were inserted into the Pledge of Allegiance in 1954, and the national motto was changed from E Pluribus Unum to In God We Trust in 1956.

Atheist Vashti McCollum was the plaintiff in a landmark 1948 Supreme Court case (McCollum v. Board of Education) that struck down religious education in U.S. public schools. Madalyn Murray O'Hair brought forth the 1963 Supreme Court case Murray v. Curlett which banned compulsory prayer in public schools. In 1963 she founded American Atheists, an organization dedicated to defending the civil liberties of atheists and advocating for the complete separation of church and state. It has been assisted by non-profit organizations such as the Freedom From Religion Foundation in the United States (co-founded by Anne Nicol Gaylor and her daughter, Annie Laurie Gaylor, in 1976 and incorporated nationally in 1978).

=== Twenty-first century ===
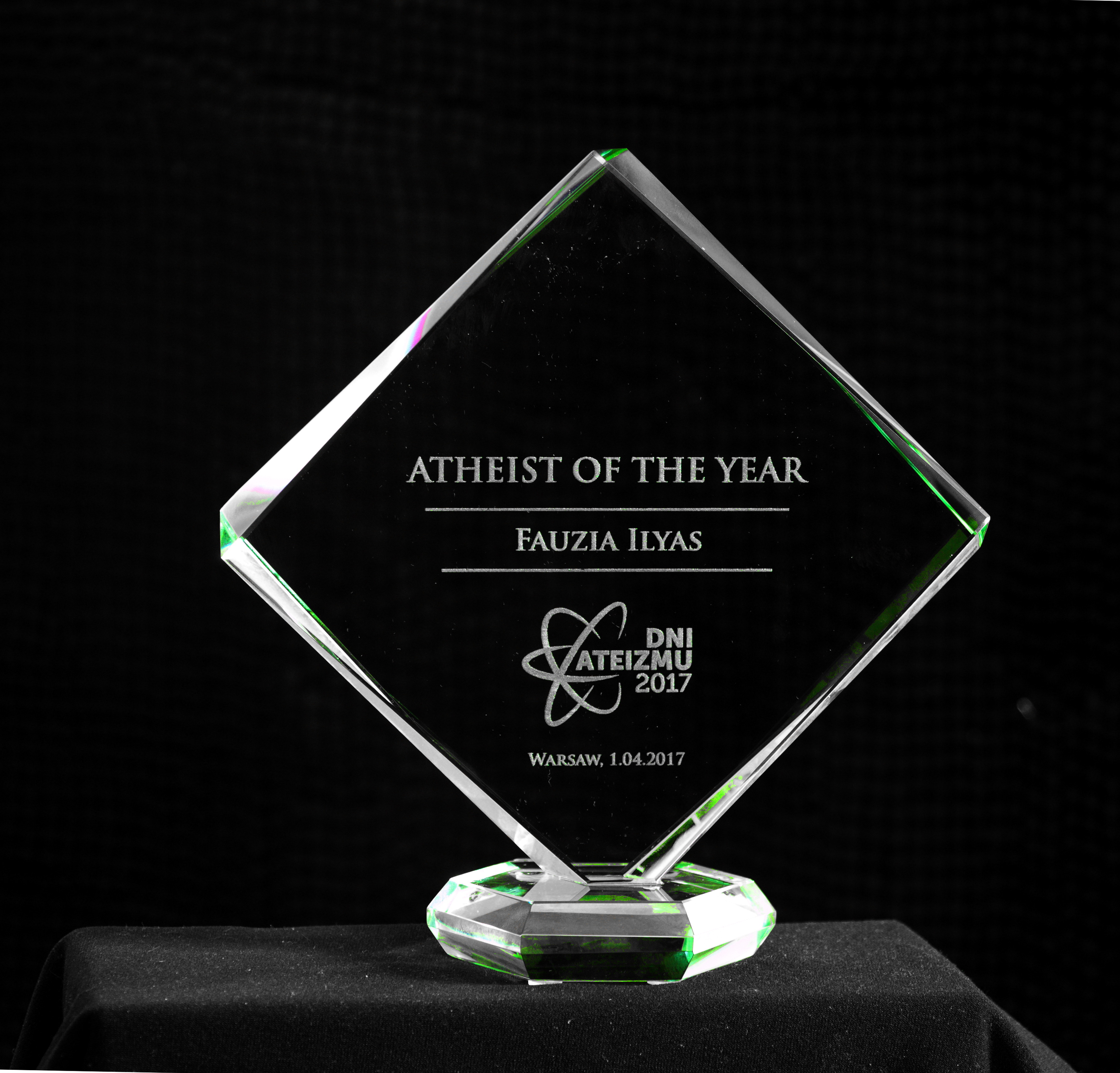
Atheist of the Year award by Kazimierz Łyszczyński Foundation

The early twenty-first century has continued to see secularism, humanism and atheism promoted in the Western world, with the general consensus being that the number of people not affiliated with any particular religion has increased. Atheist organizations aim to promote public understanding and acknowledgment of science through a naturalistic, scientific worldview, defense of irreligious people's human, civil and political rights who share it, and their societal recognition. In addition, a large number of accessible atheist books, many of which have become bestsellers, have been published by scholars and scientists such as Sam Harris, Richard Dawkins, Daniel Dennett, Christopher Hitchens, Lawrence M. Krauss, Jerry Coyne, and Victor J. Stenger.

This period saw the rise of "New Atheism", a label that has been applied to outspoken critics of theism and religion, prompted by a series of essays published in late 2006, including The God Delusion, Breaking the Spell, God Is Not Great, The End of Faith, and Letter to a Christian Nation. Atheist feminism has also become more prominent in the 2010s.

On 16 December 2016, the-then President of the United States, Barack Obama, signed into law the Frank R. Wolf International Religious Freedom Act, which amends the International Religious Freedom Act of 1998 by specifically extending protection to non-theists as well as those who do not claim any particular religion.

== See also ==
- A Brief History of Disbelief – 3-part PBS series (2007).
- A Rough History of Disbelief
- List of atheist philosophers
- Lists of atheists
- A History of Atheism in China
