= Karl Heinrich von Hoym =

German diplomat, statesman and politician

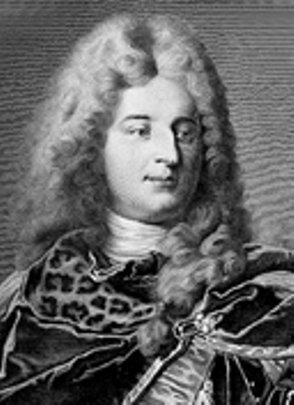
Karl Heinrich Graf von Hoym (1694-1736)

Karl Heinrich Graf von Hoym or Count Karl Heinrich von Hoym (18 June 1694 – 22 April 1736) was a diplomat and cabinet minister of the Electorate of Saxony, who was later disgraced and imprisoned, and killed himself.

== Biography ==
Karl Heinrich was born in Dresden into the distinguished noble family von Hoym, the youngest son of Baron Ludwig Gebhard von Hoym and brother of Count Adolph Magnus von Hoym, and was baptised on 19 June 1694 in the chapel of the Residenz at Dresden.

He was born Freiherr ("Baron") von Hoym, and on 18 July 1711 together with his three brothers was raised to the rank of Count of the Empire (Reichsgraf).

He set out on the Grand Tour in 1713 and eventually settled in Paris, where after 3 years he had developed his reputation sufficiently to be appointed Saxon envoy to the Court of Versailles in 1720 after the death of the previous ambassador, Burkhard von Suhm, at the suggestion of the First Minister of Saxony, Jacob Heinrich von Flemming. In 1725 he was raised to the rank of ambassador. While at Versailles he was close to the young Louis XV and his wife Maria Leszczyńska. He acquired a great knowledge of French culture and literature, and an extensive private library. He also succeeded, during the speculations of Law, in making himself a substantial fortune. Accordingly, to his stand in society and wealth, Hoym arrayed his Parisian Hôtel with tapestries, Chinese and Saxon porcelain, bronze statues and, most importantly, paintings of great value by renown Old Masters. His impressive collection encompassed works by Guido Reni, Francesco Albani, Annibale Carracci, Peter Paul Rubens, Paul Bril, and Claude Lorrain, some of which were later acquired for the Royal-Electoral Painting Gallery (nowadays Gemäldegalerie Alte Meister) in Dresden.

In 1729, Hoym returned to Saxony, where Augustus the Strong had appointed him in the previous year cabinet minister of the Saxon Departement Domestique (Department of Internal Affairs), in which his responsibilities included the management of the porcelain works at Meissen.

However, his Frenchified behaviour made him many powerful enemies. Moreover, as the champion of an alliance of Saxony with France and the sea powers against the Holy Roman Empire he attracted the hostile attention of the cabinets of Berlin and Vienna, abetted by the ambitious chamberlain Heinrich von Brühl. In addition, his connections to the French court and the queen's father, Stanislas Leszczyński, a claimant to the Polish throne, put him hopelessly in opposition to the ambitions of the Electors of Saxony regarding Poland. Karl Heinrich's many enemies both domestic and external brought him several times into disfavour at court. In 1731 he was imprisoned on a variety of charges, including disloyalty, but in the absence of any evidence, was released again. In 1734, however, another, apparently trumped-up, charge was brought against him, namely, of impregnating his own niece, the wife of Heinrich von Bünau. Again he was released, this time thanks to the intervention of Prince Alexander Jakub Lubomirski, but in 1736, against the background of the War of the Polish Succession, he was arrested a third time on a charge of treason. He was found guilty, his estates were confiscated and he was sentenced to life imprisonment.

Among his confiscated possessions was one of the few known surviving copies of the Theophrastus redivivus, a 17th-century anti-religious text, which was then given to the Bibliothèque nationale de France in Paris, where it remains today. However, the book was apparently first bought by Claude Sallier, who then donated it to the national library in 1741; however, his name does not appear on the list of individuals who bought the book in the initial August 1738 auction of von Hoym's belongings, throwing a shadow of doubt as to if von Hoym actually owned the copy or whether it was donated in his name to discredit him.

He committed suicide in his cell in Königstein Fortress (Festung Königstein) on 22 April 1736.

== Sources and external links ==
- Virginie Spenlé: Karl Heinrich von Hoym, ambassadeur de Saxe à Paris et amateur d'art, in: Dresde ou le rêve des Princes. La Galerie de peintures au XVIIIe siècle, Paris: Réunion des Musées Nationaux 2001, pp. 143–148
- "Karl Heinrich von Hoym". Allgemeine Deutsche Biographie (in German). Vol. 13. Leipzig: Duncker & Humblot. 1881. p. 219.
- Sächsische Biografie online: Karl Heinrich von Hoym (in German)
