= Xinxiu bencao =

Chinese pharmacopoeia of the Tang dynasty

The Xinxiu bencao (Chinese: 新修本草; pinyin: Xīnxiū běncǎo), (Note: Translated into English as the Newly Revised Materia Medica or the New Revised Pharmacopoeia.) also known as the Tang bencao (Chinese: 唐本草; pinyin: Táng běncǎo), is a Chinese pharmacopoeia written in the Tang dynasty by a team of officials and physicians headed by editor-in-chief Su Jing. It borrowed heavily from—and expanded upon—the earlier Bencao jing jizhu by Tao Hongjing. The text was first published in 659; although it is now considered lost in China, at least one copy exists in Japan, where the text had been transmitted to in 721.

== Contents ==
Comprising fifty-three or fifty-four juan (卷) or "chapters", the text ostensibly contained both tujing (圖經) or "illustrated descriptions" and yaotu (藥圖) or "drug pictures", although these illustrations are no longer extant. In total, some 850 drugs are listed in the text, including thirty foreign ingredients that were imported into China via the Silk Road, such as benzoin, oak galls, and peppercorn.

== Publication history ==
The idea of a bencao (pharmacopoeia) that would copy and expand on Tao Hongjing's Bencao jing jizhu was first mooted in 657 by court counsellor Su Jing (蘇敬). The project was eventually approved by Emperor Gaozong, following which a team of some twenty-two officials and physicians, including Xu Jingzong, Lü Cai, Li Chunfeng, Kong Zhiyue, and Xu Xiaochong. Li Shiji oversaw the final draft.

According to the Tang huiyao, the Xinxiu bencao was completed on the 17th day of the first lunar month of the fourth year of the Xianqing era (656–661). The text was first published in 659, making it the first state-sponsored pharmacopoeia in China, as well as one of the earliest known illustrated pharmaceutical texts.

The Xinxiu bencao was one of the most comprehensive works of its time. It was designated by the Tang government as the "official standard with regard to drug usage", although it is unclear how widespread its readership was, given the lack of a printing press then. By the Song dynasty, the text had become lost in China, although at least one copy still exists in Japan, where it had been transmitted to in 721, and fully translated into Japanese as Honzō wamyō in 1918 by palace doctor Fukane no Sukehito. In the modern era, fragments of the Xinxiu bencao have also been discovered from a book depository in a cave in Dunhuang, Gansu.
