= Jean-Baptiste de Mirabaud =

French writer and translator

Jean-Baptiste de Mirabaud (French pronunciation: [ʒɑ̃ batist də miʁabo]; 1675, Paris – 24 June 1760, Paris) was a French writer and translator.

== His life and work ==
He studied with the Oratorians and fought at the battle of Steenkerque in 1692. A friend of Jean de La Fontaine, he wrote various works of literature, history and philosophy, but failed to publish them. The Duchess of Orléans (1677-1749) made him her secretary and put him in charge of her two daughters' educations. In 1724, he published a translation of Jerusalem Delivered by Torquato Tasso, which brought him much admiration and led to his election two years later to the Académie française. In 1741, his translation of Orlando Furioso by Ludovico Ariosto had a more mixed reception. Becoming secrétaire perpétuel to the Académie in 1742, he left this post in 1755 when he felt age no longer allowed him to carry it out.

The name of Mirabaud remains associated with that of Baron d'Holbach, who had his Système de la Nature published under Jean-Baptiste Mirabaud's name in 1770. Voltaire, who violently condemned the Baron's work, denounced the deception thus "Alas! our good Mirabaud was not capable of writing a single page of the book of our redoutable adversary."

On his death in 1760, Buffon gave him a glowing homage : "Mirabaud always joined feeling to esprit, and we liked to read him just as we liked to hear him; but he had so little attachment to what he produced, he so feared the noise and glare, that he sacrificed those which could contribute most to his glory .

== Publications ==
Philosophy and history

- Sentiments des philosophes sur la nature de l'âme (1743). Published by Fontenelle in his Nouvelles libertés de penser. Online text
- Le Monde, son origine et son antiquité. De l'Âme et de son immortalité (1751). Published by César Chesneau Du Marsais and Jean-Baptiste Le Mascrier. Online text 1 2
- Opinions des anciens sur les juifs (posthumously, 1769). Reissue : Hachette, Paris, 1972. Online text
- Réflexions impartiales sur l'Évangile (posthumously, 1769). Work also attributed to baron d'Holbach. Online text

Translations

- Jérusalem délivrée, poème héroïque du Tasse, nouvellement traduit en françois (2 volumes, 1724)
- Roland furieux, poème héroïque de l'Arioste, traduction nouvelle (4 volumes, 1741)
