= Music of Prince of Qin Breaking up the Enemy's Front =

Tang dynasty music compilation

Music of Prince of Qin Breaking up the Enemy's Front (simplified Chinese: 秦王破阵乐; traditional Chinese: 秦王破陣樂) is a palace music and dance of the Tang dynasty period. It was for banquets at first, but later was used to worship.

According to Good Words of Sui and Tang (《隋唐嘉话》), Old Book of Tang， Treatise of Music (《旧唐书·音乐志》) and Extensive Records of the Taiping Era (《太平广记》), in 620, the Prince of Qin Li Shimin defeated the army of the rebellion commander Liu Wuzhou, the privates of Hedong (河东) danced and sang, the soldiers used the old melody which was popular among the Tang army to fill the new lyric, that is the embryonic form of Music of King Qin Breaking up the Enemy's Front.

In early 627, Tang Taizong called Wei Zheng to write seven lyrics, Lü Cai to compose the music, formulated the music officially. Li Shimin made the Picture of Dance of Breaking up the Enemy's Front himself, and improved the dance.

The Japanese reserved 9 legacy music books the Music of Breaking up the Enemy's Front.
