= John Needham =

English biologist and priest

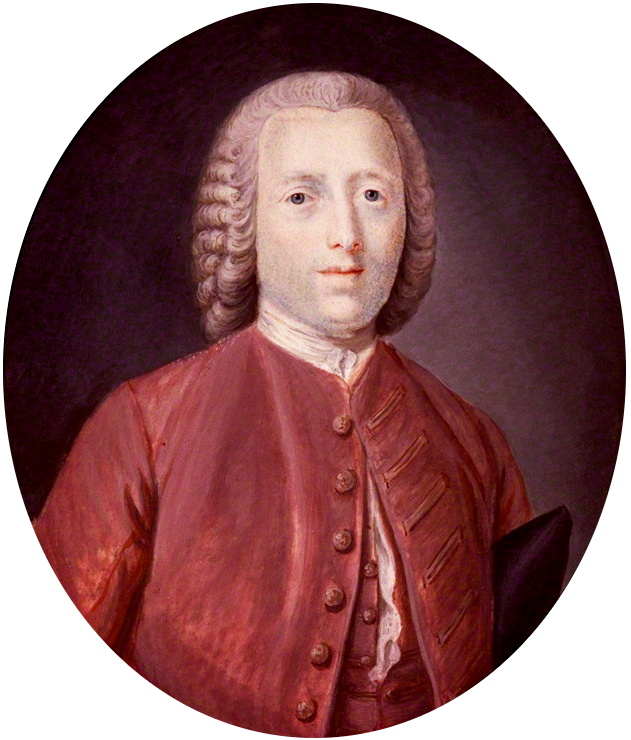
- John Needham
- Born: John Turberville Needham; 10 September 1713; London
- Died: 30 December 1781 (aged 68); Brussels
- Scientific career
- Fields: Biology

John Turberville Needham FRS (10 September 1713 – 30 December 1781) was an English biologist and Roman Catholic priest.

He was first exposed to natural philosophy while in seminary school and later published a paper which, while the subject was mostly about geology, described the mechanics of pollen and won recognition in the botany community.

He did experiments with gravy and later, tainted wheat, in containers. This was in order to experiment with spontaneous generation. Needham was curious on how this term was relevant. The experiments consisted of briefly boiling a broth mixture and then cooling the mixture in an open container to room temperature. Later, the flasks would be sealed, and microbes would grow a few days later. Those experiments seemed to show that there was a life force that produced spontaneous generation. Today, it is known that the boiling time was insufficient to kill any endospores of microbes and the cooling of flasks left open to the air could cause microbial contamination. It could also be ascertained that Needham did not use proper sterile technique. His experiments were later challenged and repeated by Lazzaro Spallanzani, an Italian scientist. Using a slightly different protocol (with a longer boiling time), Spallanzani did not have any microbes grow in his sealed flasks, contradicting Needham's findings.

He is frequently believed to be an Irish Jesuit, a myth which was created by Voltaire during a feud regarding spontaneous generation in which Voltaire was against Needham and his theories.

He became a member of the Royal Society in 1747 and was the first Catholic priest to do so.

Needham's experiments with the spontaneous generation of life were cited by French Enlightenment philosopher Baron d'Holbach in his atheist work, the System of Nature.

== Works ==
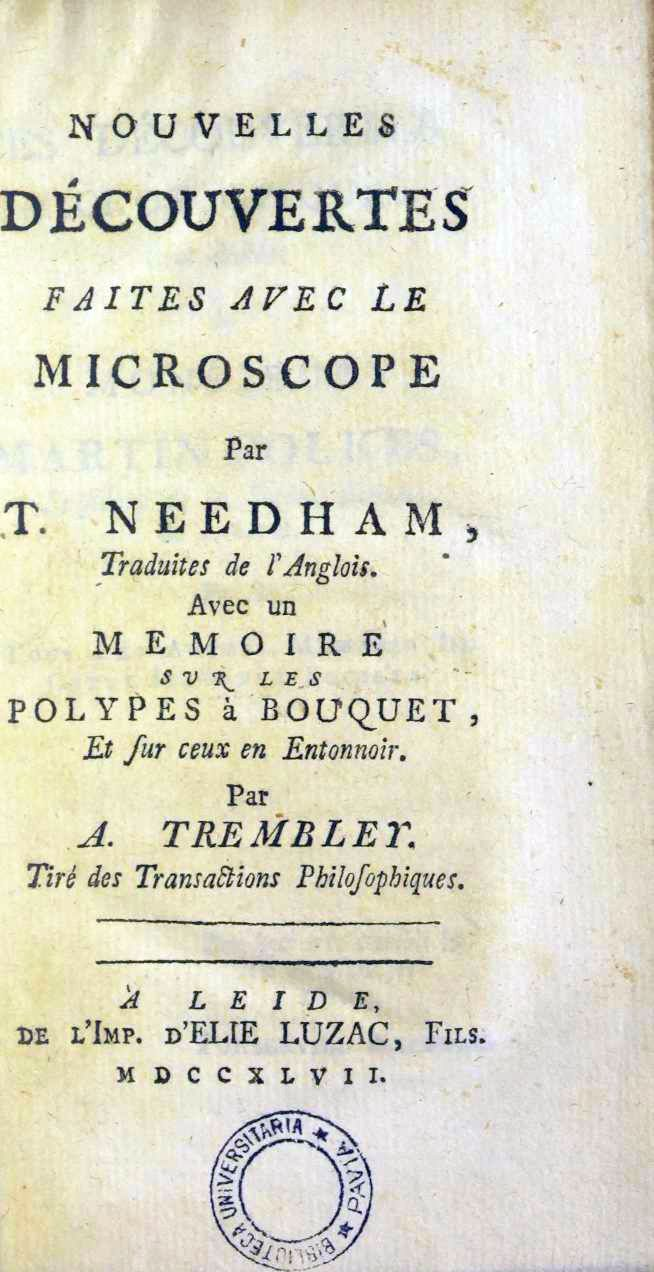
New microscopical discoveries, 1747

- An Account of Some New Microscopical Discoveries. 1745. Gallica.
- New microscopical discoveries. 1745. BHL.
- Letter from Paris. London: Charles Davis. 1746.
- Observations upon the Generation, Composition, and Decomposition of Animal and Vegetable Substances. 1749. BHL.
- Nouvelles recherches physiques et métaphysiques sur la nature et la religion (in French). Paris: Jacques Lacombe. 1769.

=== Editions ===
- New microscopical discoveries (in French). Leiden: Elie Luzac. 1747.
