= Theophrastus redivivus =

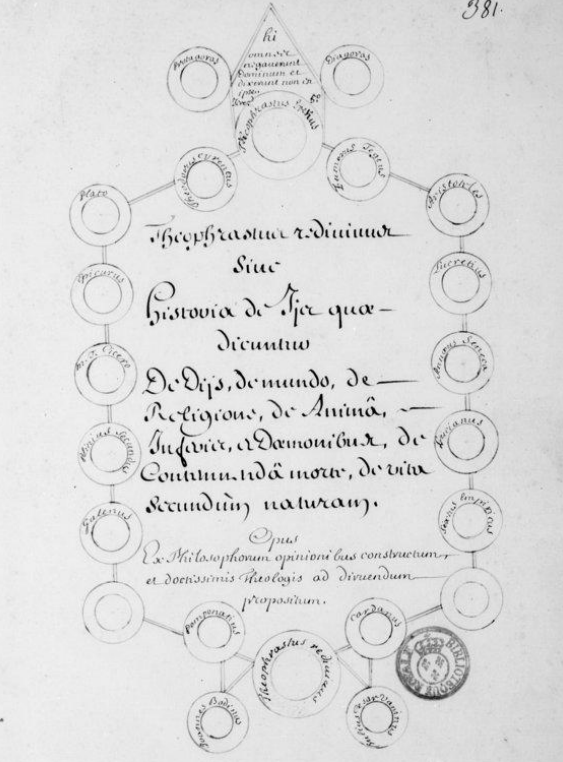
Theophrastus redivivus front page (Paris manuscript).

Theophrastus redivivus (meaning "The revived Theophrastus") is an anonymous Latin-language book published on an unknown date sometime between 1600 and 1700. The book has been described as "a compendium of old arguments against religion and belief in God" and "an anthology of free thought."

The work comprises materialist and skeptical treatises from classical sources as Pietro Pomponazzi, Lucilio Vanini, Michel de Montaigne, Machiavelli, Pierre Charron, and Gabriel Naudé. According to Brill's Encyclopaedia of the Neo-Latin World, the Theophrastus redivivus is "a comprehensive statement of atheism and materialism that seems, in effect, timeless. Unlocalized in time or place, Latin confers a kind of scandalous universality or ubiquity on the most heterodox propositions."

== Contents ==
Theophrastus redivivus is famous for proclaiming that all the great philosophers, including the eponymous Theophrastus (ancient Greek philosopher c. 371 – c. 287 BCE, successor of Aristotle), have been atheists; religions are contrived works of men; there is no valid proof for the existence of gods, and those who claim experience of a god are either disingenuous or ill. However, unlike the Treatise of the Three Impostors, another anti-religious work published around the same time, Theophrastus redivivus was never mentioned by the Age of Enlightenment philosophers and thinkers of the next century, despite being one of the first explicitly anti-religious works ever published in modern Europe.

=== Structure ===
Theophrastus redivivus is divided into a preface ("prooemium") and six treatises ("tractatus"), also called books ("libri"). Every treatise is subdivided into multiple chapters ("capita").

1. Tractatus primus qui est "de Diis" – On the Gods
2. Tractatus secundus qui est "de Mundo" – On the World
3. Tractatus tertius qui est "de religione" – On Religion
4. Tractatus quartus qui est "de anima et de inferis" – On the Soul and Hell
5. Tractatus quintus qui est "de contemnenda morte" – On the Contempt of Death
6. Tractatus sextus qui est "de vita secundum natura" – On the Natural Life

== Surviving manuscripts ==
Today, only four copies are known to survive: one in the French National Library in Paris (donated by Claude Sallier in 1741, who allegedly bought it from the auction of Karl Heinrich von Hoym's estate in August 1738), two in the Austrian National Library in Vienna, and one owned by a Belgian professor. The Italian scholar Tullio Gregory studied the treatise in his Theophrastus redivivus. Erudizione e ateismo nel Seicento (Naples 1979), and in 1981 his colleagues Gianni Paganini and Guido Canziani edited and published the text. The latter two have shown that the two Austrian manuscripts from the Hohendorf collection belonging to Prince Eugene of Savoy are probably older, based on an earlier original, and that Parisian and Belgian manuscripts are copied from Prince Eugene's holdings.

== Hessling's 1659 Theophrastus redivivus ==
The manuscript shares its title with another, printed book also titled Theophrastus redivivus, which was published in Frankfurt by an Elias Johann Hessling in 1659. The 1659 book, written in German and defending the Swiss German Renaissance scientist and occultist Paracelsus, has no connection to the anonymous work. It is unknown which work predates the other, and why the two books share the same title; neither work mentions the other. However, Latin book titles with a personal name from classical antiquity followed by "redivivus" were somewhat common in the 17th and 18th century.

== Bibliography ==
- Nicole Gengoux, (in French) Un athéisme philosophique à l'Âge classique Le "Théophrastus redivivus", 1659, 880 pages, ed. Honoré Champion, 2014 ISBN 9782745326034
