= Atheist feminism =

Branch of feminism that considers women's liberation impossible in religion

Atheist feminism is a branch of feminism that also advocates atheism. Atheist feminists hold that religion is a prominent source of female oppression and inequality, believing that the majority of the religions are sexist and oppressive towards women. In addition, atheist feminism opposes sexism within the atheist population.

== History ==
=== Ernestine Rose ===
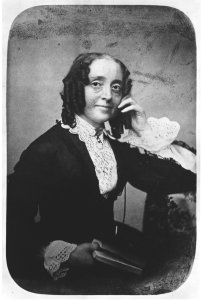
Ernestine Rose was a feminist and an atheist, well before the label atheist feminist existed.

The first known feminist who was also an atheist was Ernestine Rose, born in Poland on January 13, 1810. Her open confession of disbelief in Judaism when she was a teenager brought her into conflict with her father, who was a rabbi, and an unpleasant relationship developed. In order to force her into the obligations of the Jewish faith, her father, without her consent, betrothed her to a friend and fellow Jew when she was sixteen. Instead of arguing her case in a Jewish court (since her father was the local rabbi who ruled on such matters), she went to a secular court in a distant city, pleaded her own case, and won. In 1829 she went to England, and in 1835 she was one of the founders of the British atheist organization Association of All Classes of All Nations, which "called for human rights for all people, regardless of sex, class, color, or national origin". She lectured in England and America (moving to America in May 1836) and was described by Samuel Porter Putnam as "one of the best lecturers of her time". He wrote that "no orthodox [meaning religious] man could meet her in debate".

=== Elizabeth Cady Stanton and Matilda Joslyn Gage ===
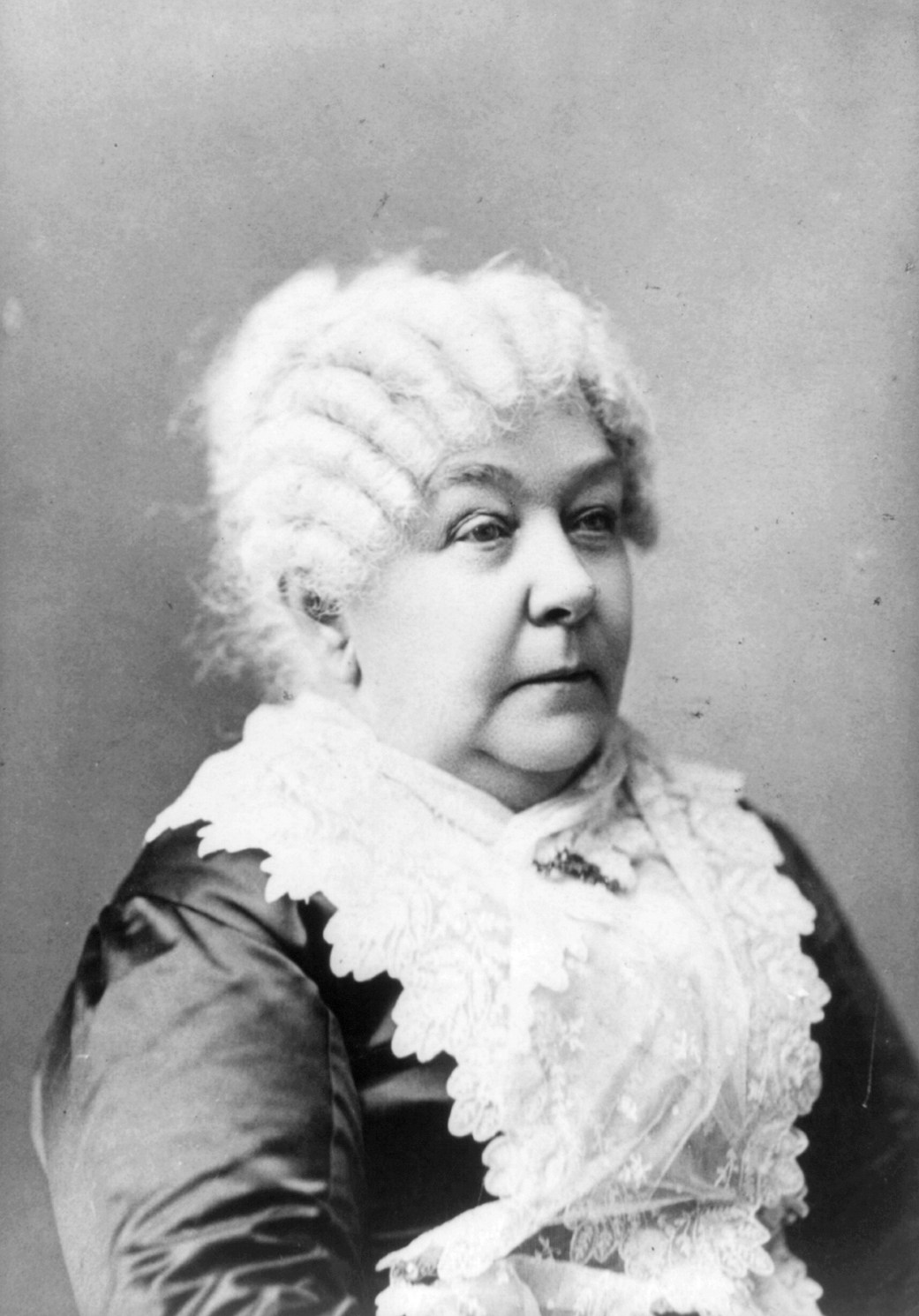
Elizabeth Cady Stanton in her later years

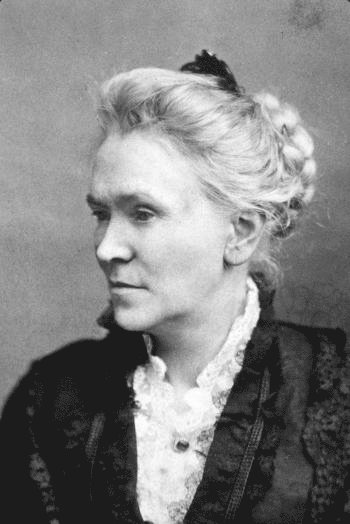
A portrait of Matilda Gage

The most prominent other people to publicly advocate for feminism and to challenge Christianity in the 1800s were Elizabeth Cady Stanton and Matilda Joslyn Gage. In 1885 Stanton wrote an essay entitled "Has Christianity Benefited Woman?" arguing that it had in fact hurt women's rights, and stating, "All religions thus far have taught the headship and superiority of man, [and] the inferiority and subordination of woman. Whatever new dignity, honor, and self-respect the changing theologies may have brought to man, they have all alike brought to woman but another form of humiliation." In 1893 Matilda Joslyn Gage wrote the book for which she is best known, Woman, Church, and State, which was one of the first books to draw the conclusion that Christianity is a primary impediment to the progress of women, as well as civilization. In 1895 Elizabeth Cady Stanton wrote The Woman's Bible, revised and continued with another book of the same name in 1898, in which she criticized religion and stated "the Bible in its teachings degrades women from Genesis to Revelation." She died in 1902.

== Modern times ==
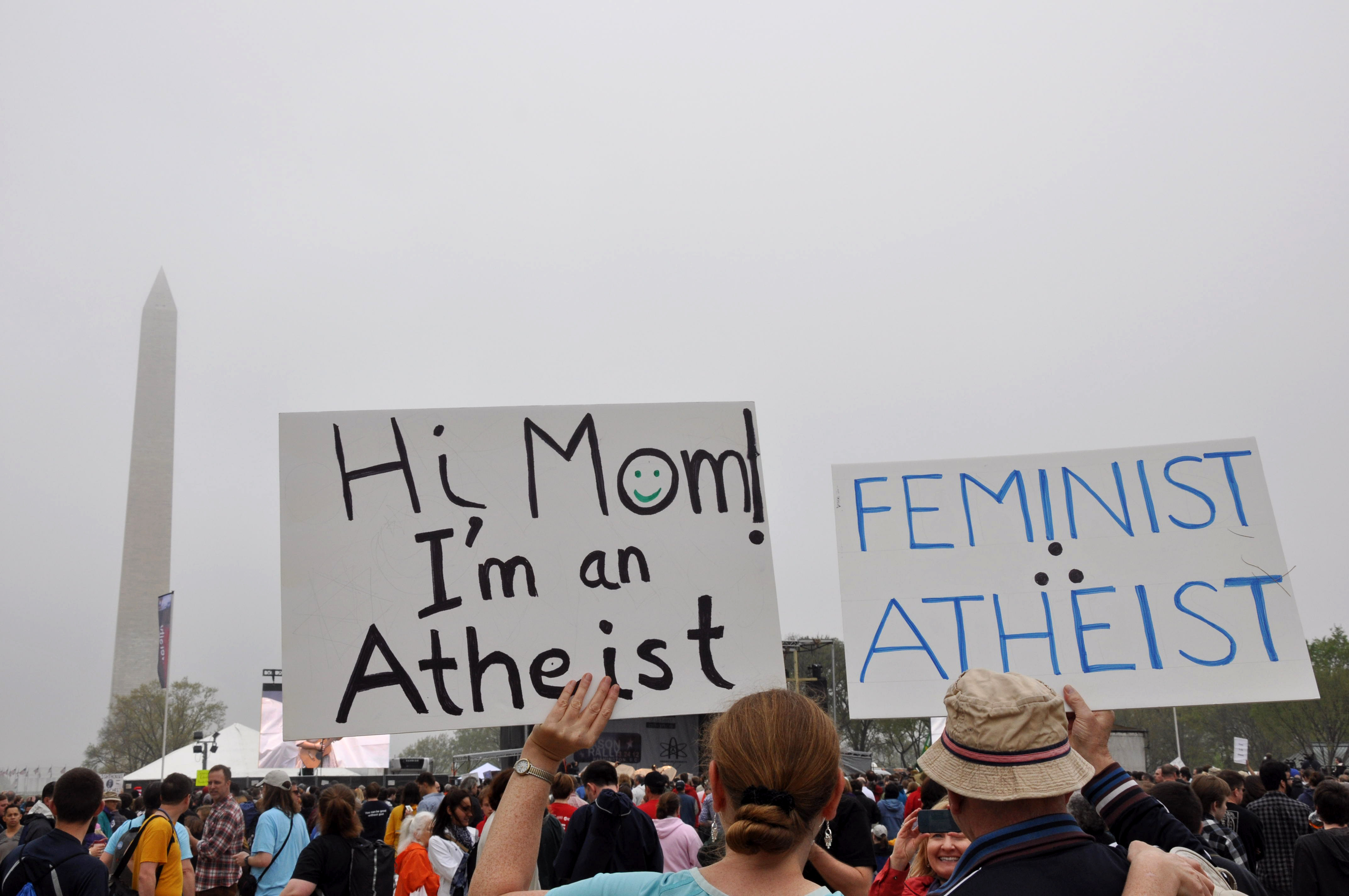
Signs in Reason Rally 2012.

Some notable atheist feminists active today include Ophelia Benson, Amanda Marcotte, Taslima Nasrin, and Sikivu Hutchinson.

In May 2012, the first "Women in Secularism" conference was held.

=== Opposition to sexism within the atheist population ===
Feminist atheists have spoken of sexism within the atheist population. For example, as Victoria Bekiempis wrote in The Guardian in 2011:

But other female atheists are blunt in their assessment of why the face of atheism doesn't necessarily reflect the gender makeup of its adherents. Annie Laurie Gaylor, who founded the Freedom From Religion Foundation with her mother, Anne Nicol Gaylor, in 1978, sums it up succinctly: "One word – sexism." Gaylor's husband, Dan Barker, who helms the organisation along with her, is usually the one invited to speaking engagements, despite her longer tenure as the organisation's leader and her numerous books on atheism.

At the June 2011 World Atheist Convention, on a panel that also included the new atheist Richard Dawkins, the atheist feminist Rebecca Watson spoke about sexism within the atheist movement. Among the various topics in a vlog posted following her return from her trip, Watson wrote about how after the talk around 4 am after leaving the hotel bar, a man from the group followed her into the hotel elevator and said to her "Don't take this the wrong way, but I find you very interesting, and I would like to talk more. Would you like to come to my hotel room for coffee?" Watson cited contextual reasons why she believed this was inappropriate, and advised, "guys, don't do that." The ensuing discussion and criticism across several websites, including Reddit and the Pharyngula blog, became highly polarized and heated to the point of name-calling along with some personal threats, including rape and death threats. The controversy further increased when Richard Dawkins joined the blog discussion later in 2011, describing her response as an overreaction since a man had merely conversed with her, "politely". Dawkins contrasted the "elevator incident" with the plight of women in Islamic countries. The result of this exchange led to an extended internet flame war that several reports dubbed "Elevatorgate". Although Elevatorgate controversy was covered or mentioned by several major media outlets with a wide audience, most of the considerable controversy occurred in the atheist blogosphere.

The atheist feminist Sikivu Hutchinson wrote in October 2019 about the hiring of David Silverman by Atheist Alliance International:

The recent decision by Atheist Alliance International (AAI) to hire the former leader of American Atheists, David Silverman, to its executive director position is yet another indication that this business-as-usual rehab strategy also applies to movement atheism, which can be just as corrupt, cronyistic, and swaggeringly hostile to women as corporate America.

Silverman resigned his position as Executive Director of Atheist Alliance International in December 2019.

== See also ==
- Domestic violence § Religion
  - Christianity and domestic violence
  - Islam and domestic violence
- Gender and religion
- History of atheism
- Matriarchal religion
- Women and religion
