= Dai Kui =

Dai Kui (Chinese: 戴逵) (ca. 331–396), courtesy name Andao (案道) was a writer, painter, and sculptor who lived during the Eastern Jin dynasty in China.

Dai Kui was born in Zhi, modern day Su county in Anhui province. He and his son, Dai Yong, were extremely influential in reinterpreting Buddhist iconography through a Chinese artistic lens; however, none of their work survives due to the later years of persecution and suppression of Buddhism. Dao Kui was the first to master the dry-lacquer technique.

He was known as a poet, painter, and musician and was one of the first to establish the tradition of scientific amateur painting (wenrenhua). He was also the leading sculptor of his time. He created bronze, lacquer statues, and carved wooden sculptures. Dai Kui painted mostly Buddhist and Daoist themes.

Dai Kui gained some notoriety after an incident where he refused to play the zither, which he was quite accomplished at, for a prince. Upon being summoned by the prince, he smashed the zither on the ground rather than perform as a court minstrel.
