= Lü Cai =

Tang dynasty musician

Lü Cai (Chinese: 吕才; pinyin: Lǚ Cái) (606-665) was a Chinese musician of early Tang period. He was versed in melody and choreography, and was expert at playing the guqin. In 629, Emperor Taizong ordered Zu Xiaosun to set down the temperament of music renewedly, Zu argued with Wang Changtong and Bai Mingda, and could not solve it. So Taizong ordered his officers to search for the able men, the zhongshuling (prime minister) Wen Yanbo recommended Lü Cai. In 631, Lü wrote Music of Victory (Gōng chéng qìng shàn lè《功成庆善乐》) for Taizong's poem. In 632, he helped Taizong to train 120 musicians to perform Music of King Qin Breaking up the Enemy's Front. Apart from music, Lü was also versed in alchemy, astronomy, maths, history and geography.

In 655 Lü Cai, in his role as Chief Steward of the Palace Medical Service (Shàng yào fèng yù 尚藥奉御) denounced the translator Xuanzang which led to a public debate between the two men. Lü Cai lost and was forced to issue a public apology.

== Bibliography ==
- Liu, Shufen. (2022). “The Waning Years of the Eminent Monk Xuanzang and his Deification in China and Japan.” In Chinese Buddhism and the Scholarship of Erik Zürcher, edited by Jonathan A. Silk and Stefano Zacchetti, 255–289. Leiden: Brill. DOI: https://doi.org/10.1163/9789004522152_010
