= Zu Xiaosun =

Sui and Tang dynasty musician

Zu Xiaosun (Chinese: 祖孝孙) was a Chinese musician of the Sui and Tang dynasties. During the Kaihuang reign period (581–600) of Emperor Wen of Sui he was appointed as Xielülang (协律郎), joined the melodizing of ritual music, and received orders to learn the Jing Fang Temperament (京房律法) from Mao Shuang (毛爽). After the founding of Tang Dynasty, Zu served as zhuzuolang (著作郎), libulang (吏部郎) and taichang shaoqing (太常少卿).

From 626 to 628, Zu composed music for Emperor Gaozu of Tang. Zu cooperated with Zhang Wenshou (张文收), solved the problem of tuning (调律) and change of keys of twelve temperament (十二律旋宫).

All Zu's works about music temperament had already been lost, only some summaries of his theory were recorded by Annals of Music (音乐志) and Annals of Rites and Nusic (礼乐志).
