= The System of Nature =

1770 work by Paul-Henri Thiry

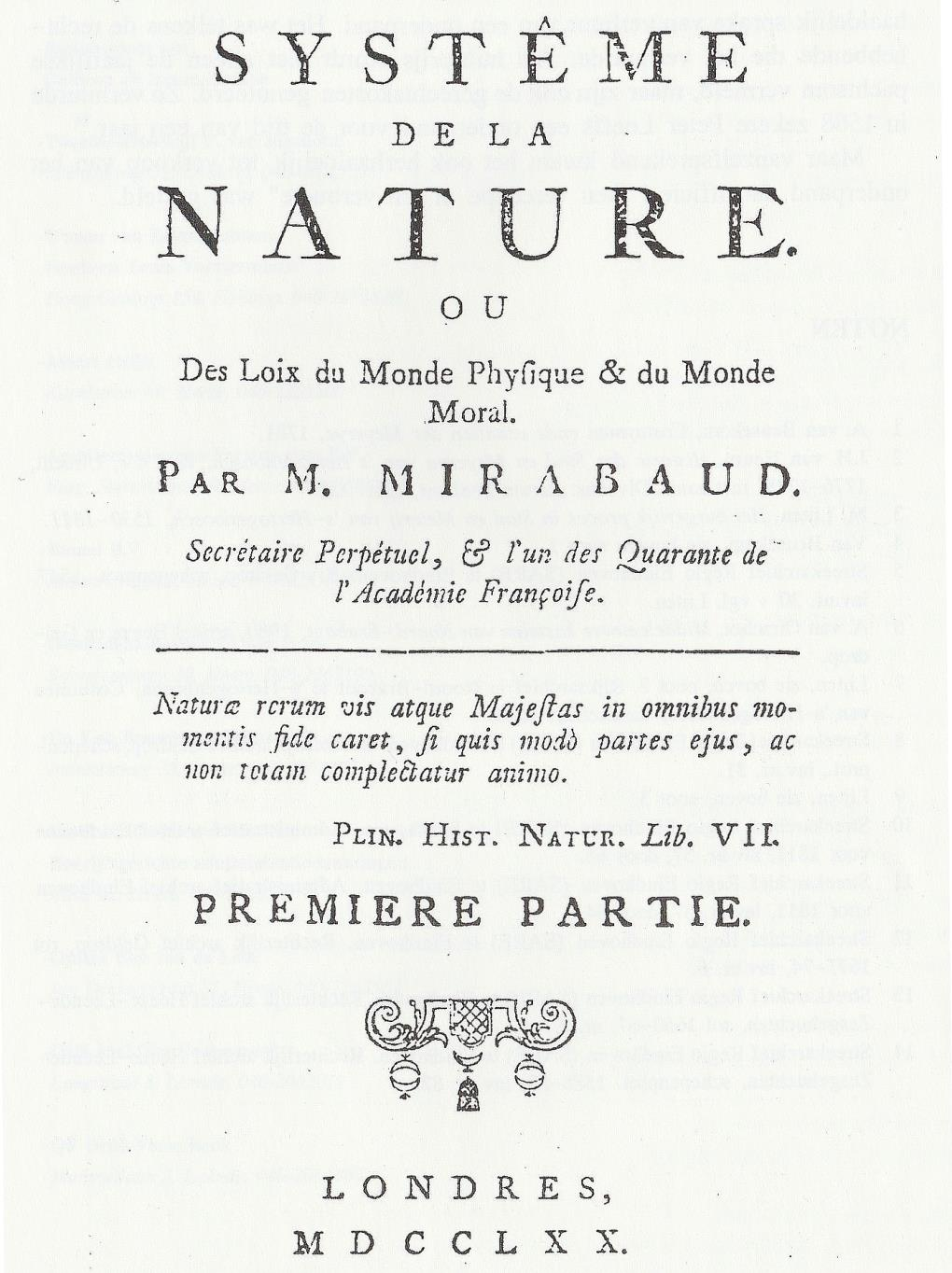
- Opening page of The System of Nature
- Author: Baron D'Holbach
- Language: French
- Publisher: Baron D'Holbach
- Publication date: 1770
- Publication place: France

The System of Nature or, the Laws of the Moral and Physical World (French: Système de la Nature ou Des Loix du Monde Physique et du Monde Moral) is a 1770 work of philosophy by Paul-Henri Thiry, Baron d'Holbach. The work is notable for making an early case for atheism and ethical naturalism.

== Overview ==
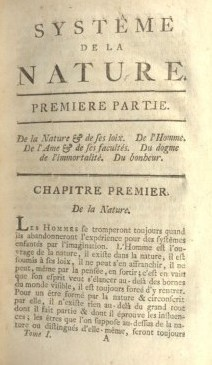
Opening page of The System of Nature.

The work was originally published under the name of Jean-Baptiste de Mirabaud, a deceased member of the French Academy of Sciences. D'Holbach wrote and published this book – possibly with the assistance of Denis Diderot but with the support of Jacques-André Naigeon – anonymously in 1770, describing the universe in terms of the principles of philosophical materialism: the mind is identified with the brain, there is no "soul" without a living body, the world is governed by strict deterministic laws, free will is an illusion, there are no final causes, and whatever happens takes place because it inexorably must. The work explicitly denies the existence of God, arguing that belief in a higher being is the product of fear, lack of understanding, and anthropomorphism.

Though not a scientist himself, d'Holbach was scientifically literate and tried to develop his philosophy in accordance with the known facts of nature and the scientific knowledge of the day, citing the experiments of John Needham as proof that life could develop autonomously without the intervention of a deity. It makes a critical distinction between mythology as a more or less benign way of bringing law-ordered thought on society, nature and their powers to the masses and theology. Theology which, when it separates from mythology raises the power of nature above nature itself and thus alienates the two (i.e. "nature", all that actually exists, from its power, now personified in a being outside nature), is by contrast a pernicious force in human affairs without parallel. Its principles are summed up in a more popular form in d'Holbach's Bon Sens, ou idées naturelles opposées aux idées surnaturelles.

== Criticism ==
The book was considered extremely radical in its day and the list of people writing refutations of the work was long. The Catholic theologian Nicolas-Sylvestre Bergier wrote a refutation titled Examen du matérialisme ("Materialism examined"). Voltaire, too, seized his pen to refute the philosophy of the Système in the article "Dieu" in his Dictionnaire philosophique, while Frederick the Great also drew up an answer to it. Commenting on the book, Frederick observed:

When one speaks in public he should consider the delicacy of superstitious ears; he should not shock anybody; he should wait till the time is sufficiently enlightened to let him think out loud.

It is speculated that Frederick was motivated to write a criticism of the System of Nature because the book contained an attack not just on religion, but also on monarchy.

== Appreciation and influence ==
D'Holbach's friend Denis Diderot had enthusiastically endorsed the book:

What I like is a philosophy clear, definite, and frank, such as you have in the System of Nature. The author is not an atheist on one page and a deist on another. His philosophy is all of one piece.

Percy Bysshe Shelley became an ardent atheist after reading The System of Nature, and proceeded to translate the book into English. According to Will Durant, the System of Nature contains the most comprehensive description of materialism and atheism in the entire history of philosophy.

In his student days, Goethe had recoiled with revulsion at the contents in the book: "It appeared to us so grey, so Cimmerian, so corpse – like that we had difficulty in enduring its presence and shuddered before it as before a spectre"; in his old age he harbored similar views: "We belong to the laws of nature, even when we rebel against them."

According to Voltaire, the book was very popular among the populace, including "scholars, the ignorant, and women".
