= Claude Sallier =

French librarian

- Born: 4 April 1685; Saulieu, Bourgogne-Franche-Comté, France
- Died: 6 September 1761 (aged 76); Paris, France
- Occupations: librarian, clergyman, philologist

Claude Sallier (4 April 1685 – 6 September 1761) was a French clergyman, librarian, and philologist, as well as professor of Hebrew at the Royal College of France and keeper of the Bibliothèque du Roi during the Age of Enlightenment.

== Biography ==
Claude Sallier grew up in Saulieu where his passion for learning led him to seek out and eventually collect books that helped him learn Greek, Latin, Syriac, Hebrew, Italian, Spanish, and English. In 1715, he moved to Paris and joined the Académie des Inscriptions et Belles-Lettres. Four years later in 1719, Sallier became a professor of Hebrew at the Royal College of France and in 1721 was appointed Keeper of the King's Library. He served as a librarian for King Louis XV from 1721 to 1761 and was elected a member of the French Academy in 1729.

During his tenure with the academy, Sallier conducted research and wrote for the volumes of memoirs published by the Académie des Inscriptions including a Discourse on the Origin and on the Character of Parody and a Discourse on the Perspective of Ancient Painting or Sculpture.

Claude Sallier is mainly noted for his work as the king's librarian where he was responsible for maintaining all manuscripts and printed works in the Royal Library. He wrote the library catalogs and discovered the poems of Charles d'Orleans among the collection and shared his findings with the French Academy in 1734. Sallier garnered a reputation as a "model librarian, of admirable zeal and accuracy, who was always considerate and polite towards the public, always ready to provide information to scholars, to facilitate their research, and to share his own immense knowledge". Denis Diderot and Jean le Rond d'Alembert, two other prominent figures of the Age of Enlightenment, acknowledged Sallier in their writing, stating: "We are mainly sensitive to the obligations that we have to Mr. Abbé Sallier, Keeper of the King's Library: he allowed us, with that politeness which is natural to him, and which is inspired by the pleasure of fostering a great enterprise, to select from the rich fund that he curates, everything which could shed light or addition to our Encyclopedia". After Sallier's death in 1761, Jean-Jacques Rousseau added to the praise of his character, writing: "Mr. Abbé Sallier provided me, from the King's Library, with the books and manuscripts that I needed, and often I gained, from his conversation, more certain information than from my research. I believe I owe to the memory of this honest and learned man a tribute of gratitude that all the scholars he was able to server will surely share with me".

== Sallier and Europe ==
During the Age of Enlightenment, the cultural influence of France made the King's Library in Paris a "beacon", with Claude Sallier as its guardian for forty years. This position led Sallier to exchange considerable amounts of correspondence and books with scholars from England, Holland, Prussia, Poland, Sweden, Russia, Switzerland, and Spain. On May 10, 1744, he was elected a member of the Royal Society of London and to the Royal Academy of Berlin in 1746, and he was also a correspondent of the Royal Society of Stolkholm and the Royal Society of Madrid.

Sallier's prominence and breadth of knowledge led him to give a large number of conferences and lectures on classic scholars such as Plato, Plutarch, Sophocles, and Cicero; on poets like Charles d'Orléans and Christine de Pizan; on sculpture and painting, and even on ancient clocks. He frequented literary salons and associated closely with the society's intellectual elite including Rousseau, Diderot, Voltaire, Buffon, Charles Marie de La Condamine, and Réamur. In addition to these activities, he also devoted himself to the study of mathematics.

== France's first public library ==
While serving as the king's librarian, Claude Sallier wanted to ensure that the people in his hometown would have access to the kinds of books that he had desired growing up. With this goal in mind, he set out to make culture and learning accessible to everyone in Saulieu and from 1737 to 1750, he sent boxes of books to the town, establishing one of the first public libraries in France.
