= Jayarāśi Bhaṭṭa =

9th-century Indian philosopher

Jayarāśi Bhaṭṭa (fl. c. 800) was an Indian philosopher known for his radical skepticism who most likely flourished between 800-840 probably in southern India. He was the author of one of the most extraordinary philosophical works in Indian history, the Tattvopaplavasiṃha (tattva-upa.plava-siṃha "The Lion that uproots all Philosophies"/"The Lion upsetting all Principles") in which he professed radical skepticism, which posits the impossibility of knowledge. In his work, he attempts to show the contradictions of various philosophical positions as well as the counter positions. He is loosely affiliated to the materialist Cārvāka/Lokāyata school of philosophy but his affiliation with charvaka is disputed among scholars. He has been differently classified as a sceptic, agnostic or materialist atheist.

His main claim is that it is not possible to arrive at true knowledge with standard means recognized by the traditionally adopted model of cognitive procedures (pramāṇa) in Indian epistemology, because one should first properly define basic criteria of validity for valid cognitive procedures, which is not possible without a prior true knowledge of reality against which we could test the procedures for validity etc. As it is traditionally argued, our knowledge of reality and of objects depends on valid cognitive procedures. However, as Jayarāśi points out, all valid cognitive procedures are either fundamentally flawed and ultimately unreliable or they require further valid cognitive procedures, and these stand in the same need etc. Therefore, within the traditional epistemological model, we can neither formulate proper definitions of valid cognitive procedures nor define what reality is and what basic categories are.

The text was discovered in a single manuscript in the 20th century. Its original 1940 edition attributed it to the materialist Charvaka school, but scholarly opinion on this point remains divided. Some consider Jyarāśi's philosophy as a heterodox philosophy in Indian materialist tradition or the Charvaka/Lokayata tradition as his radical skepticism makes him & his philosophy different from typical Charvaka/Lokayata materialist tradition. His work Tattvopaplavasiṃh remains the only authentic, albeit not 'orthodox' treatise of the charvaka/Lokayata tradition. The work is primarily epistemological in nature, reminiscent of the sceptical philosophy of David Hume.

== Tattvopaplavasimha ==
The manuscript of Tattvopaplavasimha was discovered in 1926 and published in 1940 by Saṁghavī and Pārīkh. The book examines epistemology, where Jayarāśi considers the pramāna (sources of knowledge) accepted in establishing conclusions (perception, inference, and testimony), and proves that none of them are sufficient for establishing knowledge. Inference relies on inductive reasoning, which cannot be shown to be universal premises. Testimony requires the reliability of the witness, which must be established by another of the pramāna. Even direct perception cannot establish truth, because it requires that the perception not be erroneous or illusory, which also cannot be established. Therefore, Jayarāsi argues that none of the sources of knowledge are valid, and nothing can be known for certain.

Jayarāsi challenged the āstika establishment's belief in supernatural beings by attacking their epistemology. Since none of the sources of knowledge are valid, how can anything be said about these beings? Therefore, he argued for the reasonability of atheism, and that happiness in one's life is the most reasonable goal. Jayarasi represented a philosophy of extreme skepticism, claiming no school of philosophy can claim its view of reality as knowledge, including the Cārvāka itself; however, because Cārvāka philosophy represents common sense, it could be used as a guide.

== Association with Cārvāka ==
Tattvopaplavasimha is regarded by some authors as belonging to the Cārvāka (Lokāyata) school. Sukhlal Sanghvi and Rasiklal Parikh, D.R. Shastri, Eli Franco, Karin Presidendanz, and Piotr Barcelowicz are examples. Franco (1994), for instance, says "Tattvopaplavasimha is the only Lokayata text which has been discovered so far".

This view is opposed by scholars including Karel Werner, Walter Ruben, K.K Dixit, Debiprasad Chattopadhyaya, M. K. Gangopadhyaya, A H Salunkhe, and Ramkrishna Bhattacharya. Werner (1995), for instance, is sceptical of the claim that Tattvopaplavasimha is a Cārvāka text. He however accepts that the text is an important secondary source for Cārvāka.

There has been some controversy concerning whether Jayarāśi could at all be ranked among the representatives of the Indian materialist school, i.e., among the Cārvākas / Lokāyatas. Until the publication of the Tattvôpaplava-siṁha, Jayarāśi was considered a typical representative of the materialist school. It all changed when the publication of the work in 1940 made the text available to scholars. The publication revealed that Jayarāśi’s view are far from what one considered ‘standard’ or ‘orthodox’ materialism and hardly compatible with what we so far knew about the schools of the Cārvākas / Lokāyatas. As a result, a wide range of conflicting interpretations abound as to how to classify Jayarāśi’s philosophy.

Sukhlāljī Saṁghavī and Rasiklāl C. Pārīkh (1940: xi-xii) take the text as ‘a work of the Lokāyata or Cārvāka school, or to be more precise – of a particular division of that school’, emphasising that Jayarāśi ‘is developing the doctrine of the orthodox Lokāyata’ with a ‘critical method’ (p. xii). The tradition of ascribing the view to Saṁghavī and Pārīkh that the Tattvôpaplava-siṁha is ‘a genuine Cārvāka work’ relies rather on the misreading of what both the authors say: they are well aware that Jayarāśi develops an original and independent school within what he himself considered a materialist tradition. This view, adopted also by Ruben (1958), is somewhat modified by Franco (1987: 4–8), who speaks of a ‘radical change from a rather primitive materialism to a highly sophisticated form of scepticism’, and also recently by Ethan Mills (2018), who claims that Jayarāśi developed ‘materialist strains’ and represented ‘skepticism about philosophy’, or ‘skepticism about epistemology’ (Mills (2015), (2018)).

Thus, a group of other researchers (e.g., Koller (1977), Matilal (1985: 482), Matilal (1986: 27), Solomon (2010: xvi), Jha (2013: vii), Gokhale (2015: 156–157), Mills (2018)) classify Jayarāśi as a sceptic, either loosely affiliated to the Cārvāka / Lokāyata tradition or not at all, even as an anti-religious sceptic (Matilal (1985: 482)), a radical sceptic (Franco (1987: 3–8)), ‘the full-fledged form of Indian Skepticism’ (Solomon (2010: xvi)), an extreme sceptic who represents ‘a kind of anarchism in the realm of values’ (Gokhale (2015: 180, 155)), sometimes also as an agnostic (Ruben (1958); Matilal (1985: 483, n. 10)), or a combination of both, being an author of ‘a work in defence of scepticism, or at best, agnosticism’ (Debiprasad Chattopadhyaya’s “Editor’s Note” to Chattopadhyaya–Gangopadhyaya (1990: xiv)). A rather unusual stance on Jayarāśi’s affiliation is represented by K.K. Dixit (1962: 103) / (1990: 529), who claims that he was both a materialist and… ‘a worshipper of illogic’.

Still another line of researchers disagree that Jayarāśi belonged to the materialist tradition at all, typical proponents of this opinion being Debiprasad Chattopadhyaya (1959), (1989) and Karel Werner (1995). Chattopadhyaya (1989) argues that since Jayarāśi criticises all philosophical views and schools, he cannot be reckoned as an adherent of the Cārvāka / Lokāyata tradition, because one can either be a materialist or sceptic; and clearly Jayarāśi’s philosophical views do not fit into the typical materialist framework. Karel Werner (1995) seems to support such an approach, although with some reservations. Recently, also Ramkrishna Bhattacharya (2009: 51, 76 n. 43) follows this line of interpretations and argues that ‘Jayarāśi was not a Cārvāka/Lokāyata’, suggesting that he was not a sceptic but represented ‘a fundamental idealist (solipsist) position’. To this group belong also both A.K. Warder (1956: 52), who accepts that he was neither a materialist nor sceptic but a positivist instead, and K.N. Jayatilleke (1963: 82), who interprets him as ‘not a sceptic but an absolute nihilist in his metaphysics’ and ‘a pragmatic materialist’ and ‘a logical sceptic’ (p. 91).

There could hardly be a better source of information on the true affiliation of Jayarāśi than the author himself. He nowhere states in his work that he is a Cārvāka / Lokāyata, in which he does not differ from all other Indian authors who nowhere mention their philosophical affiliations in the form: ‘The author of the present work is Buddhist’ or ‘I am a follower of the Nyāya school’. In most cases, such affiliations are communicated through the opening sections, e.g. in the introductory verses (maṅgalâcaraṇa), or in the colophons, but usually an indirect manner, e.g. by paying homage to the Awakened One (buddha) or to a guru or Mahêśvara, or through some other hint, but it is hardly ever done directly, in an unequivocal manner. Unfortunately, the preserved text of Tattvôpaplava-siṁha does not contain any introductory verses (probably there were none). The only concealed information in the opening section of the work could be found the first verse that occurs in the very beginning which says: ‘The worldly path (laukiko mārgaḥ) should be followed…/ With respect to everyday practice of the world (loka-vyavahāra), the fool and the wise are similar’ (TUS, p.1.9–10 = Franco (1987: 68–6–7) = Solomon (2010: 1–2) = Jha (2013: 2)), quoted from some other source, taken as authoritative by Jayarāśi. The expression ‘the worldly path’ (laukiko mārgaḥ) often occurs as a reference to the Lokāyata (‘the followers of the worldly [practice]’), e.g. by Haribhadra in his ŚVS1.64. Most importantly, however, Jayarāśi on several occasions quotes verses of Bṛhaspati in order to either support his own opinion or to show that there is no disagreement between the Tattvôpaplava-siṁha and the tradition of Bṛhaspati (cf. Franco (1987: 5)). Further, he explicitly mentions the materialist teacher by name and refers to him with reverence ‘Honourable Bṛhaspati’ (bhagavān bṛhaspatiḥ, TUS, p.45.10–11 = Franco (1987: 228.10) = Solomon (2010: 229) = Jha (2013: 187)),[1] the reverential term occurring only once in the whole work. This is rather unique, for Jayarāśi does not seem to follow any authorities or to quote passages and opinions which he unreservedly views in favourable light. There can hardly be any doubt, that Jayarāśi placed himself within that tradition and apparently acknowledged that he was originally trained within it.

In the colophon of the treatise (TUP, p. 125.13–18 = Franco (1987: 7) = Solomon (2010: 98) = Jha (2013: 463–464)), Jayarāśi explicitly pays homage to Bṛhaspati, here referred to by his traditional epithet ‘preceptor of gods’ (sura-guru; cf. Bhattacharya (2009: 25, 51, 76)), and so does the author refers to himself as ‘preceptor of deities (gods)’ (deva-guru):

‘Even [all] such unshakeable reductio arguments (vikalpa) that escaped the attention of the preceptor of gods (i.e. Bṛhaspati) find their way into this lucid [treatise] that crushes the conceit of charlatans. This [lucid treatise], titled “The Lion [Destroying] the Delusion of Categories”, which contributes to great advantage and will gain excellent reputation, has been composed by [me], the preceptor of deities (gods) [known as] Bhaṭṭa Śrī Jayarāśi.[2] [These] reductio arguments of Jayarāśi [found] in this [treatise] are efficacious in annihilating the charlatans, are elaborated by [Jayarāśi who is] the ocean of knowledge, [and are meant to] vanquish disputants.’

The idea which Jayarāśi here expresses is clear: he follows the footsteps of his own preceptor, Bṛhaspati (both ‘preceptor of gods’), developing the latter’s arguments and augmenting them with his own, more sophisticated.

Jayarāśi criticises basically all philosophical schools with two exceptions: the Advaita Vedānta of Śaṅkara and the Cārvāka / Lokāyata school. The reason for being silent on the tradition of Śaṅkara was that the latter was either contemporaneous or posterior to Jayarāśi, but there would have been no reason not to formulate any criticism against the Cārvāka / Lokāyata school, if that had not been Jayarāśi’s own tradition. Further, even though Jayarāśi is generally very cautious not to express his own positive views and theories, there are several exceptions, which clearly reveal his materialistic outlook.

There is also some external evidence corroborating to a certain degree the thesis about Cārvāka / Lokāyata affiliation of Jayarāśi. Vidyānanda who first mentions Jayarāśi brings some interesting details to light (alluded to above). In his Aṣṭa-śatī (AṣS 29.20–36.7), he explicitly indicates a category of nihilistic thinkers who reject a number of vital principles and claim that ‘There is no [reliable] omniscient authority (tīrtha-kāra), there is no [reliable] cognitive criterion (pramāṇa), there is no [reliable] authoritative doctrine (samaya) or [reliable] Vedas, or any kind of [reliable] reasoning (tarka), because they contradict each other,’ and he quotes a popular verse: ‘Reasoning is not established, testimonies differ, there is no sage whose words are a cognitive criterion (i.e., authoritative), the essence of the moral law (dharma) is concealed in a secret place (i.e., is not available). The [proper] path is that taken by the majority of people’[3]. Whether the verse comes from an unidentified Lokāyata source, which is not impossible, or not, it is echoed by Jayarāśi in the above mentioned verse at the beginning of his work and the expression ‘the worldly path’ (laukiko mārgaḥ). Interestingly, the verse has an obvious sceptical underpinning. The category of such ‘nihilists’ includes (1) the followers of the Lokāyata school (laukāyatika, AṣS 29.26), also known as the Cārvāka (AṣS 30.25), who are associated with the view that there is just one cognitive criterion, i.e. perception, and (2) the category of ‘those who propound the dissolution of [all] categories’ (tattvôpaplava-vādin, AṣS 31.2). Vidyānanda (AṣS 31.2 ff.) explains who the latter are: ‘Some who are those who propound the dissolution of [all] categories take (1) all the categories of cognitive criteria such as perception etc. and (2) all the categories of the cognoscibles as dissolved (i.e., not established)’. Throughout his text, Vidyānanda keeps these two traditions – the Lokāyata and the Tattvôpaplava — separate, although he does acknowledge that they are genetically related, the main difference between them being whether one recognises at least one cognitive criterion (Cārvāka / Lokāyata) or none (Jayarāśi). Further on, Vidyānanda begins the exposition of materialism (AṣS, p. 35.22 ff.) which is designated with a generic term ‘cognitive criteria-free assumption’ (apramāṇikā … iṣṭi), among which the first variety represents standard materialists who accept perception as the only cognitive criterion (AṣS, p. 35.19–37.9), and the second variety concerns ‘those who propound the dissolution of [all] categories’ (tattvôpaplava-vādin) who do not accept any cognitive criteria (pramāṇa) (AṣS, p. 37.10 ff.). Also Anantavīrya explicitly classifies Jayarāśi as a materialist by making a pun on the word cārvāka: ‘The author of “[The Lion Destroying] the Delusion of Categories’” says what is charmingly chastised by the Cārvākas’ (SViṬ, p. 277.19: tattvôpaplava-kṛd āha – cārvākaiś cāru carcitam…).

A typical charge against Jayarāśi’s affiliation to materialists (Cārvāka / Lokāyata), known for two main claims – that there is only one cognitive criterion (pramāṇa), namely perception, and the four elements compose all the universe, including consciousness – would the apparent paradox: Jayarāśi seems to acknowledge neither. This led Bhattacharya (2017: 353–354) to dispute, on philologically implausible grounds, that Jayarāśi refers to Bṛhaspati and the Bṛhaspati-sūtra as his own tradition.

According to Debiprasad Chattopadhyaya, "Jayarāśi, who claims to be intellectually superior to Bṛhaspati, could ... hardly be a follower of Bṛhaspati himself, i.e., could hardly be the leader of any imaginary offshoot of the Cārvāka or Bārhaspatya system". In support of his view that Tattvopaplavasimha is not a Cārvāka/Lokāyata text, Chattopadhyaya says "it is moreover necessary to remember that Jayarāśi claims as his final achievement the annihilation of the vanity of the Pāṣaṇḍin [pākhaṇḍin]-s (Tattvopaplavasiṃha Baroda edition p.125). Now whatever might have been the exact meaning of the word pāṣaṇḍin, it could by no stretch of imagination have excluded the Lokāyatikas and Cārvākas."

Salunkhe also holds that Jayarasi Bhatta did not belong to the Cārvāka school of philosophy as he denies even Pratyakşa pramana and four Mahābhūtas that Cārvāka had accepted. He notes Jayarsi as an agnostic and anti-philosophic person rather than a materialistic Lokāyatika.

Ramkrishna Bhattacharya adduces an argument from within the text itself to refute the claim that Tattvopaplava-siṃha is a Cārvāka text. He says, "there is indeed a Cārvāka at the very beginning of the Tattvopaplava-siṃha. But he is not Jayarāśi, but another person who is presented as a Cārvāka out to challenge Jayarāśi’s doctrine of upsetting tattva as such. This objector has to be a Cārvāka, for who but a Cārvāka would refer to the basic premises of materialism and stand upon them? The presence of this objector and the way Jayarāśi gets into controversy with him clearly indicate that Jayarāśi himself was not a Cārvāka or did not even belong to ‘a section of the Cārvāka’ (cārvākaikadeśya)".

However, the earliest external recipients of Jayarāśi’s ideas, the Jaina thinkers Vidyānanda and Anantavīrya, importantly ascribe to Jayarāśi or to his immediate materialist tradition a saying that ‘Bṛhaspati’s aphorisms are primarily meant to refute the opponents with respect to all [issues].’ This serves as an external evidence that Jayarāśi did acknowledge the authority of Bṛhaspati and his aphorisms but interpreted them in the spirit of his own methodological scepticism.

That there must have been some strain among the materialists prior to Jayarāśi which both admitted that the world is composed of the four elements and at the same time apparently doubted that there is any cognitive criterion (pramāṇa) is reflected by Akalaṅka, who points to the following paradox such a materialist would have to face: ‘As a result of the absence of cognitive criteria (pramāṇa) [the materialist] cannot ascertain that perception, and nothing else, is the only one [cognitive criterion], or [ascertain] the essence of cognoscible objects. Since, when other cognitive criteria are negated, a [proper] definition of perception becomes inexplicable, what [cognoscible objects] by what [cognitive criteria] could be established or negated, on account of which [one could maintain that] the world is composed of the four elements?’ (SVi 4.12, p. 272.3–5).

Of significance is that Vidyānanda puts Jayarāśi on par with the Buddhist doctrine of Emptiness (śūnya-vāda), as represented by Nāgārjuna, and with Vedāntic idealists (brahma-vāda), as three kinds of self-refuting theories (TŚVA 80.22–81.14; 195.14–16). This might theoretically be taken as evidence that all three represented scepticism. However, since there is no hint that Vedāntic idealists were sceptics at all at that time, and we have strong evidence that Jayarāśi was not a sceptic, what Mills (2018) takes to be the three pillars of skepticism in classical India, namely Nāgārjuna, Jayarāśi and Śriharṣa, represented here by a forerunner, cannot be classified as sceptics, despite their commonalities, as noticed by Vidyānanda.

Jayarāśi can be therefore taken as a genuine representative of an offshoot of the Cārvāka / Lokāyata tradition, primarily because he himself thought he was a follower of Bṛhaspati’s materialist tradition, and probably because he had originally been trained in the materialist system. It also seems very likely that the representatives of the Cārvāka / Lokāyata system occasionally had sceptical inclinations prior to Jayarāśi, which helped him to abandon typically materialist claims and undertake his sceptical project. However, neither he nor his work can be taken as typical representatives of the Cārvāka / Lokāyata school or a first-hand source of information about that tradition. Despite this, the work remains the only authentic, albeit not ‘orthodox’ treatise of the Cārvāka / Lokāyata tradition that has come down to us.

== Bibliography ==
- Balcerowicz, Piotr, "Jayarāśi", The Stanford Encyclopedia of Philosophy (2011).
- Chattopadhyaya, Debiprasad (1964). Indian Philosophy: A Popular Introduction. Delhi: People’s Publishing House.
- Franco, Eli (1994). Perception, Knowledge, and Disbelief: A Study of Jayarasi's Scepticism. Delhi: Motilal Banarasidas.
- Narayan Campawat, "Jayarasi Bhatta", in Great Thinkers of the Eastern World, Ian McGready, ed., New York: Harper Collins, 1995, pp. 202–206. ISBN 0-06-270085-5
  - review: Karel Werner, Bulletin of the School of Oriental and African Studies, University of London (1995)
- Saṁghavī, Sukhlāljī; Pārīkh, Rasiklāl C. (eds.): Tattvopaplavasimha of Shri Jayarasi Bhatta. Edited with an introduction and indices. Gaekwad Oriental Series 87, Oriental Institute, Baroda 1940 [Reprinted: Bauddha Bharati Series 20, Varanasi 1987].
- Salunkhe, AH (2009). Astikshiromani Charvaka (in Marathi). Satara: Lokayat Prakashan.
- Werner, Karel, 1995, “Review of Eli Franco: Perception, knowledge and disbelief: a study of Jayarāśi's scepticism, Delhi, Motilal Banarsidass 1994”, Bulletin of the School of Oriental and African Studies, 58(3): 578.
