= What Is Living and What Is Dead in Indian Philosophy =

Book by Debiprasad Chattopadhyaya

What is Living and What is Dead in Indian Philosophy
- Author: Debiprasad Chattopadhyaya
- Language: English
- Subject: Philosophy, Materialism
- Published: 1976 (People's Publishing House)
- Publication place: India
- Pages: 656 (2nd edition, 1976)

What is Living and What is Dead in Indian Philosophy is a 1976 book by Debiprasad Chattopadhyaya.

Explaining the relationship between the soul and consciousness in the Nyaya-Vaisesika philosophy, Debiprasad Chattopadhyaya makes three points. First, consciousness in this view is knowledge (jnana) in an empirical sense. Second, consciousness is one of the multiple qualities of the soul. Third, consciousness is a transient quality, not a permanent quality. By itself, the soul is without consciousness; consciousness is produced in the soul only when it is conjoined with certain other entities. Hiriyanna, commenting on this point, notes:

A peculiar feature of the system is that it makes jnana or knowledge an attribute of the self, and that too, not an essential, but only an adventitious one...The self thus differs from matter only in that it may become conscious and not that it is itself mental in nature. The two other attributes of it, viz. desire (icchā) and volition (yatna) are conceived more or less similarly. They, like knowledge, refer to an object(savi-sayaka) and are meaningless without such a reference. The really mental or spiritual element in the doctrine accordingly is not the self, but these three attributes which are all transient.

Hiriyanna expresses his perplexity in reviewing the Nyaya-Vaisesika view of consciousness, and then comes out with a comment equating this view with the Charvaka view of consciousness:

We know the manner in which knowledge arises according to the Nyaya-Vaisesikas, though it is hard to understand how when the aid to its genesis--the self, manas, senses, and object--are wholly inert (jada), it can be knowledge at all...The position is scarcely distinguishable from that of the Charvakas.
