= Walter Ruben =

Walter Ruben may refer to:

- J. Walter Ruben (1899–1942), American screenwriter, film director and producer
- Walter Ruben (Indologist) (1899–1982), German Indologist
