= Lokayata: A Study in Ancient Indian Materialism =

Book by Debiprasad Chattopadhyaya

- Title page of Lokayata
- Author: Debiprasad Chattopadhyaya
- Language: English
- Subject: Philosophy, Materialism
- Published: 1959 (People's Publishing House)
- Publication place: India
- Pages: 696 (7th edition, 1992)
- ISBN: 978-8170070061

Lokayata: A Study in Ancient Indian Materialism is a famous book on the Lokayata school of Indian philosophy by Debiprasad Chattopadhyaya, first published in 1959.

In this book Chattopadhyaya used the method of historical materialism to explore the dehavada of Lokayatas, revealing how their philosophy was connected with the mode of securing material means of subsistence. The study questioned the mainstream view that Indian philosophy's sole concern was the concept of Brahman. "From the scattered references in the ancient philosophical literature which were completely hostile to the ancient materialist schools, Debiprasad Chattopadhyaya reconstructed the philosophy of Lokayata, which consistently denied the existence of Brahman and viewed pratyaksa (perception) as the sole means of knowledge. He demolished the so-called "interpretation of synthesis" which sought to combine the diverse philosophical traditions of India to form a ladder that led to the philosophy of Advaita Vedanta.

Commenting on Lokayata the German indologist Walter Ruben called Chattopadhayaya a "thought-reformer", who was "conscious of his great responsibility towards his people living in a period of struggle for national awakening and of world-wide fighting for the forces of materialism, progress, humanism and peace against imperialism. He has written this book Lokayata: A Study in Ancient Indian Materialism against the old fashioned conception that India was and is the land of dreamers and mystics".

The book has been translated into many Indian languages including Kannada and Telugu.
