= Surendranath Dasgupta =

Indian scholar of Sanskrit and eastern philosophy (1887–1952)

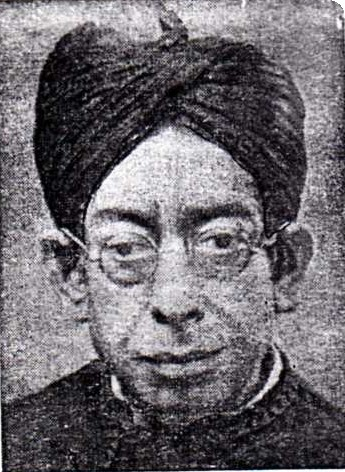
- Born: 18 October 1887; Kushtia, Bangladesh (Formerly British India)
- Died: 18 December 1952 (aged 65); Lucknow, Uttar Pradesh, India
- Education: Sanskrit College; University of Calcutta
- Alma mater: University of Cambridge
- Occupation: Professor
- Spouse: Himani Devi
- Children: 6, including Maitreyi Sen

Education
- Doctoral advisor: J. M. E. McTaggart

Philosophical work
- Doctoral students: Debiprasad Chattopadhyaya

Surendranath Dasgupta (18 October 1887 – 18 December 1952) was an Indian scholar of Sanskrit and Indian philosophy.

== Family and education ==
Surendranath Dasgupta was born to a Vaidya family in Kushtia, Bengal (now in Bangladesh), on Sunday, 18 October 1885, corresponding to Dashami Shukla (i.e., the tenth day) of the month of Āśvin and coinciding with the festivals of Dussehra and Durga Visarjan. His ancestral home was in the village Goila in Barisal District. He studied at Ripon College in Calcutta and graduated with honours in Sanskrit. Later, in 1908, he received his master's degree from Sanskrit College, Calcutta. He got a second master's degree in Western philosophy in 1910 from the University of Calcutta.

Prof. Dasgupta married Himani Devi, the younger sister of Himanshu Rai, India's pioneer film director and founder of the Bombay Talkies movie studios. They had six children together: three daughters, Maitreyi Devi (Sen) (1914-1989), Chitrita Devi (Gupta) (1919- 2006) – both of whom became famous writers – and Sumitra Majumdar; and three sons, Subhayu Dasgupta, Prof.Sugata Dasgupta, founder of Jai Prakash Institute of Social Change,and Prof. Subhachari Dasgupta, all of whom left behind works valuable to nation-building. Sumitra Majumdar, the youngest and last surviving child, died in Goa in September 2008. One of his granddaughters (daughter of Chitrita Devi) Prof. Lali Chatterjee, is a noted astro physicist based in United States.

Dasgupta earned the Griffith Prize in 1916 and his doctorate in Indian philosophy in 1920. Maharaja Sir Manindra Chandra Nandy now urged him to go to Europe to study European philosophy at its sources, and generously bore all the expenses of his research tour (1920–22). Dasgupta went to England and distinguished himself at Cambridge as a research student in philosophy under Dr. J. M. E. McTaggart. During this time the Cambridge University Press published the first volume of the History of Indian Philosophy (1921). He was also appointed lecturer at Cambridge and nominated to represent Cambridge University at the International Congress of Philosophy in Paris.

His participation in the debates of the Aristotelian Society, London, the leading philosophical society of England, and of the Moral Science Club, Cambridge, earned for him the reputation of being an almost invincible controversialist. Great teachers of philosophy like Ward and McTaggart, under whom he studied, looked upon him not as their pupil but as their colleague. He received his Cambridge doctorate for an elaborate thesis on contemporary European philosophy.

The impressions that he had made by his speeches and in the debates at the Paris Congress secured for him an invitation to the International Congress at Naples in 1924, where he was sent as a representative of the Bengal Education Department and of the University of Calcutta; later on, he was sent on deputation by the Government of Bengal to the International Congress at Harvard in 1926. In that connection he delivered the Harris Foundation lectures at Chicago, besides a series of lectures at about a dozen other universities of the United States and at Vienna, where he was presented with an illuminated address and a bronze bust of himself. He was invited in 1925 to the second centenary of the Academy of Science, Leningrad, but he could not attend for lack of Government sanction. In 1935, 1936 and 1939 he was invited as visiting professor to Rome, Milan, Breslau, Königsberg, Berlin, Bonn, Cologne, Zurich, Paris, Warsaw and England.

== Career ==
His career in teaching began with a short stint as a lecturer in Rajshahi College. Later, he became a professor of Sanskrit and Bengali in Chittagong College. After some time, he went back to graduate school and received a PhD from the University of Calcutta, and later went to England to work on his second PhD at the University of Cambridge. Following his return in 1924, Dasgupta joined the Presidency College as professor of philosophy. Later, he became the principal of Sanskrit College, and later joined the University of Calcutta as a professor.

In 1932, he served as president of the Indian Philosophical Congress. His own philosophy was known as Theory of Dependent Emergence. The list of his famous students includes scholars like Mircea Eliade and Debiprasad Chattopadhyaya.

By 1941, Dasgupta's relationship with his wife Himani Madhuri Dasgupta had broken down, and in 1945, he married Suramā Mitra (10 September 1907 – 12 June 1998), his colleague and former student. Suramā Dasgupta went on to postgraduate study at the University of Cambridge, taking a PhD in philosophy from Cambridge in 1948. She went on to become a Reader in the Philosophy Department at Lucknow University. Dasgupta's former wife was upset at his remarriage, alleging that she and Surendranath had not been divorced.

The University of Warsaw made him an honorary Fellow of the Academy of Sciences. He was elected Fellow of the Royal Society of Literature. The Societé des Amis du Monde of Paris offered him a special reception, and the renowned Louis Renou, a Sanskrit professor at the University of Paris, wrote to him afterwards: "While you were amongst us, we felt as if a Sankara or a Patanjali was born again and moved amongst us."

Kind and simple and gentle as he was, Dasgupta was always undaunted in challenging scholars and philosophers. In the second International Congress of Philosophy in Naples, the thesis of Dasgupta's paper was that the philosophy of Benedetto Croce (1866-1952) had been largely anticipated by Dharmakirtti and Dharmottara, and that where Croce differed, he (Croce) was himself in error. On account of internal differences Croce had no mind to join the Congress, but the fact that Dasgupta was going to challenge his philosophy and prove it to be second-hand in open congress, induced him to do so.

In the same way he challenged Louis de La Vallée-Poussin, the great Buddhist scholar, before a little assembly presided over by J. M. E. McTaggart. In the meetings of the Aristotelian Society Dasgupta was a terror to his opponents, his method of approach being always to point out their errors. He inflicted this treatment on many other scholars, particularly Fyodor Shcherbatskoy (Stcherbatsky) (1866-1942) and Sylvain Lévi (1863-1935).

== A History of Indian Philosophy ==
When Lord Ronaldshay, the governor of Bengal, came to visit Chittagong College, he had a long talk with Professor Dasgupta in his classroom, and was so much impressed by it that he expressed the desire that the first volume of the History of Indian Philosophy might be dedicated to him.

Originally Dasgupta's plan was to write out the history of Indian systems of thought in one volume. Therefore, he tried to condense the materials available within the compass of one book. But as he went on collecting materials from all parts of India, a huge mass of published and unpublished texts came to light, and the plan of the work enlarged more and more as he tried to utilise them.

This was the first and only attempt to write out in a systematic manner a history of Indian thought directly from the original sources in Sanskrit, Pali and Prakrit. In a work of the fourteenth century A.D., the Sarva-darsana-samgraha of Madhavacarya, we find a minor attempt to give a survey of the different philosophical schools of India.

But the account given there is very brief, and the work does not give an exhaustive survey of all the different systems of philosophy. In the present series the author traced, in a historical and critical manner, the development of Indian thought in its different branches from various sources, a considerable portion of which lies in unpublished manuscripts. He spared no pains and underwent a tremendous amount of drudgery in order to unearth the sacred, buried treasures of Indian thought.

He revised his original plan of writing only one volume and thought of completing the task in five consecutive volumes constituting a series. He shouldered this gigantic task all alone, with the sincerest devotion and unparalleled enthusiasm and zeal.

In 1942 he retired from Sanskrit College and was appointed King George V Professor of Mental and Moral Science in the University of Calcutta. He worked there for three years and delivered the Stephanos Nirmalendu lectures on the history of religions. He had been suffering from heart trouble since 1940 but was still carrying on his various activities and research work.

In 1945 he retired from the Calcutta University and was offered the Professorship of Sanskrit at Edinburgh which had fallen vacant after the death of Professor Keith. The doctors also advised a trip to England. On his arrival in England, he fell ill again.

In November 1945 he delivered his last public lecture on Hinduism in Trinity College, Cambridge. Since then, he was confined to bed with acute heart trouble. In spite of his ill health while in England, he was in constant touch with his close students. He stayed in England for five years (1945–50). Even then he published the fourth volume of his History of Indian Philosophy at the Cambridge University Press, the History of Sanskrit Literature at Calcutta University, Rabindranath the Poet and Philosopher with his Calcutta publishers, and a book on aesthetics in Bengali. In 1950 he returned to Lucknow.

In 1951, through friendly help given by Pandit Jawaharlal Nehru, he started writing the fifth and final volume of the History of Indian Philosophy. He had also planned to write out his own system of philosophy in two volumes. His friends and students requested him several times to complete the writing of his own first. Yet he looked upon his work on Indian philosophy as the sacred mission of his life and thought himself to be committed to that purpose.

With strong determination and unwavering devotion, he brought his life's mission very near its completion. Until the end of his life, he was working for this, and completed one full section just a few hours before his death, on 18 December 1952. Even on this last day of his life, he worked in the morning and afternoon on the last chapter of the section of Southern Śaivism. He died peacefully at eight in the evening, while discussing problems of modern psychology.

== Selected writings ==
- Dasgupta, Surendranath (1922–1955). A History of Indian Philosophy. Vol. 1–5. London: Cambridge University Press. Vol. 1 | Vol. 2 | Vol. 3 | Vol. 4 | Vol. 5.
- General Introduction to Tantra Philosophy
- Natural Sciences of the Ancient Hindus (ed. by D.P. Chattopadhyaya, Indian Council of Philosophical Research)
- A Study of Patanjali
- Yoga Philosophy in Relation to Other Systems of Indian Thought
- A History of Sanskrit Literature
- Rabindranath: The Poet and Philosopher
- Hindu Mysticism (1927)
- Kavyavicha
- Saundaryatattva
- Rabidipika
