= Nature (philosophy) =

Philosophical term

Nature has two inter-related meanings in philosophy and natural philosophy. On the one hand, it means the set of all things which are natural, or subject to the normal working of the laws of nature. On the other hand, it means the essential properties and causes of individual things.

How to understand the meaning and significance of nature has been a consistent theme of discussion within the history of Western Civilization, in the philosophical fields of metaphysics and epistemology, as well as in theology and science. The study of natural things and the regular laws which seem to govern them, as opposed to discussion about what it means to be natural, is the area of natural science.

The word "nature" derives from Latin nātūra, a philosophical term derived from the verb for birth, which was used as a translation for the earlier (pre-Socratic) Greek term phusis, derived from the verb for natural growth. Already in classical times, philosophical use of these words combined two related meanings which have in common that they refer to the way in which things happen by themselves, "naturally", without "interference" from human deliberation, divine intervention, or anything outside what is considered normal for the natural things being considered.

Understandings of nature depend on the subject and age of the work where they appear. For example, Aristotle's explanation of natural properties differs from what is meant by natural properties in modern philosophical and scientific works, which can also differ from other scientific and conventional usage.

== Classical nature and Aristotelian metaphysics ==
The Physics (from ta phusika "the natural [things]") is Aristotle's principal work on nature. In Physics II.1, Aristotle defines a nature as "a source or cause of being moved and of being at rest in that to which it belongs primarily". In other words, a nature is the principle within a natural raw material that is the source of tendencies to change or rest in a particular way unless stopped. For example, a rock would fall unless stopped. Natural things stand in contrast to artifacts, which are formed by human artifice, not because of an innate tendency. (The raw materials of a bed have no tendency to become a bed.) In terms of Aristotle's theory of four causes, the word natural is applied both to the innate potential of matter cause and the forms which the matter tends to become naturally.

According to Leo Strauss, the beginning of Western philosophy involved the "discovery or invention of nature". In contrast, the "pre-philosophical equivalent of nature" was supplied by "such notions as 'custom' or 'ways'". In ancient Greek philosophy on the other hand, Nature or natures are ways that are "really universal" "in all times and places". This in turn presupposes one can "find one's bearings in the cosmos" "on the basis of inquiry", but not for example on the basis of human customs such as religions or laws. To put this "discovery or invention" into the traditional terminology, what is "by nature" is contrasted to what is "by convention". This understanding of nature as something contrasted with human conventions remains a strong tradition in modern Western thinking. Science, according to Strauss' commentary of Western history is the contemplation of nature, while technology was or is an attempt to imitate it.

Going further, the philosophical concept of nature or natures as a special type of causation - for example that the way particular humans are is partly caused by something called "human nature" is an essential step towards Aristotle's teaching concerning causation, which became standard in all Western philosophy until the arrival of modern science.

Depiction of Aristotle

Whether it was intended or not, Aristotle's inquiries into this subject were long felt to have resolved the discussion about nature in favor of one solution. In this account, there are four different types of cause:

- The material cause is the "raw material" - the matter which undergoes change. One of the causes of a statue being what it is might be that it is bronze. All meanings of the word nature encompass this simple meaning.
- The efficient cause is the motion of another thing, which makes a thing change, for example a chisel hitting a rock causes a chip to break off. This is the way which the matter is forming into a form so that it become substance like what Aristotle said that a substance must have a form and matter in order to call it substance. This is the motion of changing a single being into two. This is the most obvious way in which cause and effect works, as in the descriptions of modern science. But according to Aristotle, this does not yet explain that of which the motion is, and we must "apply ourselves to the question whether there is any other cause per se besides matter".
- The formal cause is the form or idea which serves as a template towards which things develop - for example following an approach based upon Aristotle we could say that a child develops in a way partly determined by a thing called "human nature". Here, nature is a cause.
- The final cause is the aim towards which something is directed. For example, a human aims at something perceived to be good, as Aristotle says in the opening lines of the Nicomachean Ethics.

The formal and final cause are an essential part of Aristotle's "Metaphysics" - his attempt to go beyond nature and explain nature itself. In practice they imply a human-like consciousness involved in the causation of all things, even things which are not man-made. Nature itself is attributed with having aims.

The artificial, like the conventional therefore, is within this branch of Western thought, traditionally contrasted with the natural. Technology was contrasted with science, as mentioned above. And another essential aspect to this understanding of causation was the distinction between the accidental properties of a thing and the substance - another distinction which has lost favor in the modern era, after having long been widely accepted in medieval Europe.

To describe it another way, Aristotle treated organisms and other natural wholes as existing at a higher level than mere matter in motion. Aristotle's argument for formal and final causes is related to a doctrine about how it is possible that people know things: "If nothing exists apart from individual things, nothing will be intelligible; everything will be sensible, and there will be no knowledge of anything—unless it be maintained that sense-perception is knowledge". Those philosophers who disagree with this reasoning therefore also see knowledge differently from Aristotle.

Aristotle then, described nature or natures as follows, in a way quite different from modern science:

"Nature" means:
(a) in one sense, the genesis of growing things — as would be suggested by pronouncing the υ of φύσις long—and
(b) in another, that immanent thing from which a growing thing first begins to grow.
(c) The source from which the primary motion in every natural object is induced in that object as such. All things are said to grow which gain increase through something else by contact and organic unity (or adhesion, as in the case of embryos). Organic unity differs from contact; for in the latter case there need be nothing except contact, but in both the things which form an organic unity there is some one and the same thing which produces, instead of mere contact, a unity which is organic, continuous and quantitative (but not qualitative). Again, "nature" means
(d) the primary stuff, shapeless and unchangeable from its own potency, of which any natural object consists or from which it is produced; e.g., bronze is called the "nature" of a statue and of bronze articles, and wood that of wooden ones, and similarly in all other cases. For each article consists of these "natures," the primary material persisting. It is in this sense that men call the elements of natural objects the "nature," some calling it fire, others earth or air or water, others something else similar, others some of these, and others all of them. Again in another sense "nature" means
(e) the substance of natural objects; as in the case of those who say that the "nature" is the primary composition of a thing, or as Empedocles says: Of nothing that exists is there nature, but only mixture and separation of what has been mixed; nature is but a name given to these by men. Hence as regards those things which exist or are produced by nature, although that from which they naturally are produced or exist is already present, we say that they have not their nature yet unless they have their form and shape. That which comprises both of these exists by nature; e.g. animals and their parts. And nature is both the primary matter (and this in two senses: either primary in relation to the thing, or primary in general; e.g., in bronze articles the primary matter in relation to those articles is bronze, but in general it is perhaps water—that is if all things which can be melted are water) and the form or essence, i.e. the end of the process, of generation. Indeed from this sense of "nature," by an extension of meaning, every essence in general is called "nature," because the nature of anything is a kind of essence. From what has been said, then, the primary and proper sense of "nature" is the essence of those things which contain in themselves as such a source of motion; for the matter is called "nature" because it is capable of receiving the nature, and the processes of generation and growth are called "nature" because they are motions derived from it. And nature in this sense is the source of motion in natural objects, which is somehow inherent in them, either potentially or actually.

— Metaphysics 1014b-1015a, translated by Hugh Tredennick, emphasis added. (Note: Greek, with emphasis added as a guide: φύσις λέγεται ἕνα μὲν τρόπον ἡ τῶν φυομένων γένεσις, οἷον εἴ τις ἐπεκτείνας λέγοι τὸ υ, ἕνα δὲ ἐξ οὗ φύεται πρώτου τὸ φυόμενον ἐνυπάρχοντος: ἔτι ὅθεν ἡ κίνησις ἡ πρώτη ἐν ἑκάστῳ τῶν φύσει ὄντων ἐν αὐτῷ ᾗ αὐτὸ [20] ὑπάρχει: φύεσθαι δὲ λέγεται ὅσα αὔξησιν ἔχει δι᾽ ἑτέρου τῷ ἅπτεσθαι καὶ συμπεφυκέναι ἢ προσπεφυκέναι ὥσπερ τὰ ἔμβρυα: διαφέρει δὲ σύμφυσις ἁφῆς, ἔνθα μὲν γὰρ οὐδὲν παρὰ τὴν ἁφὴν ἕτερον ἀνάγκη εἶναι, ἐν δὲ τοῖς συμπεφυκόσιν ἔστι τι ἓν τὸ αὐτὸ ἐν ἀμφοῖν ὃ ποιεῖ ἀντὶ τοῦ [25] ἅπτεσθαι συμπεφυκέναι καὶ εἶναι ἓν κατὰ τὸ συνεχὲς καὶ ποσόν, ἀλλὰ μὴ κατὰ τὸ ποιόν. ἔτι δὲ φύσις λέγεται ἐξ οὗ πρώτου ἢ ἔστιν ἢ γίγνεταί τι τῶν φύσει ὄντων, ἀρρυθμίστου ὄντος καὶ ἀμεταβλήτου ἐκ τῆς δυνάμεως τῆς αὑτοῦ, οἷον ἀνδριάντος καὶ τῶν σκευῶν τῶν χαλκῶν ὁ χαλκὸς ἡ [30] φύσις λέγεται, τῶν δὲ ξυλίνων ξύλον: ὁμοίως δὲ καὶ ἐπὶ τῶν ἄλλων: ἐκ τούτων γάρ ἐστιν ἕκαστον διασωζομένης τῆς πρώτης ὕλης: τοῦτον γὰρ τὸν τρόπον καὶ τῶν φύσει ὄντων τὰ στοιχεῖά φασιν εἶναι φύσιν, οἱ μὲν πῦρ οἱ δὲ γῆν οἱ δ᾽ ἀέρα οἱ δ᾽ ὕδωρ οἱ δ᾽ ἄλλο τι τοιοῦτον λέγοντες, οἱ δ᾽ [35] ἔνια τούτων οἱ δὲ πάντα ταῦτα. ἔτι δ᾽ ἄλλον τρόπον λέγεται ἡ φύσις ἡ τῶν φύσει ὄντων οὐσία, οἷον οἱ λέγοντες τὴν φύσιν εἶναι τὴν πρώτην σύνθεσιν, ἢ ὥσπερ Ἐμπεδοκλῆς λέγει ὅτι "φύσις οὐδενὸς ἔστιν ἐόντων, ἀλλὰ μόνον μῖξίς τε διάλλαξίς τε μιγέντων ἔστι, φύσις δ᾽ ἐπὶ τοῖς ὀνομάζεται ἀνθρώποισιν. "Empedocles Fr. 8 διὸ καὶ ὅσα φύσει ἔστιν ἢ γίγνεται, ἤδη ὑπάρχοντος ἐξ οὗ πέφυκε γίγνεσθαι ἢ εἶναι, οὔπω φαμὲν [5] τὴν φύσιν ἔχειν ἐὰν μὴ ἔχῃ τὸ εἶδος καὶ τὴν μορφήν. φύσει μὲν οὖν τὸ ἐξ ἀμφοτέρων τούτων ἐστίν, οἷον τὰ ζῷα καὶ τὰ μόρια αὐτῶν: φύσις δὲ ἥ τε πρώτη ὕλη (καὶ αὕτη διχῶς, ἢ ἡ πρὸς αὐτὸ πρώτη ἢ ἡ ὅλως πρώτη, οἷον τῶν χαλκῶν ἔργων πρὸς αὐτὰ μὲν πρῶτος ὁ χαλκός, ὅλως δ᾽ [10] ἴσως ὕδωρ, εἰ πάντα τὰ τηκτὰ ὕδωρ) καὶ τὸ εἶδος καὶ ἡ οὐσία: τοῦτο δ᾽ ἐστὶ τὸ τέλος τῆς γενέσεως. μεταφορᾷ δ᾽ ἤδη καὶ ὅλως πᾶσα οὐσία φύσις λέγεται διὰ ταύτην, ὅτι καὶ ἡ φύσις οὐσία τίς ἐστιν. ἐκ δὴ τῶν εἰρημένων ἡ πρώτη φύσις καὶ κυρίως λεγομένη ἐστὶν ἡ οὐσία ἡ τῶν ἐχόντων [15] ἀρχὴν κινήσεως ἐν αὑτοῖς ᾗ αὐτά: ἡ γὰρ ὕλη τῷ ταύτης δεκτικὴ εἶναι λέγεται φύσις, καὶ αἱ γενέσεις καὶ τὸ φύεσθαι τῷ ἀπὸ ταύτης εἶναι κινήσεις. καὶ ἡ ἀρχὴ τῆς κινήσεως τῶν φύσει ὄντων αὕτη ἐστίν, ἐνυπάρχουσά πως ἢ δυνάμει ἢ ἐντελεχείᾳ.)

It has been argued, as will be explained below, that this type of theory represented an oversimplifying diversion from the debates within Classical philosophy, possibly even that Aristotle saw it as a simplification or summary of the debates himself. But in any case the theory of the four causes became a standard part of any advanced education in the Middle Ages.

== In Eastern philosophy ==
=== Indian philosophy ===
Jain philosophy attempts to explain the rationale of being and existence, the nature of the Universe and its constituents, the nature of bondage and the means to achieve liberation. Jainism strongly upholds the individualistic nature of soul and personal responsibility for one's decisions; and that self-reliance and individual efforts alone are responsible for one's liberation.

Ajñana was a Śramaṇa school of radical Indian skepticism and a rival of early Buddhism and Jainism. They held that it was impossible to obtain knowledge of metaphysical nature or ascertain the truth value of philosophical propositions; and even if knowledge was possible, it was useless and disadvantageous for final salvation. They were seen as sophists who specialized in refutation without propagating any positive doctrine of their own. Jayarāśi Bhaṭṭa (fl. c. 800), author of the skeptical work entitled Tattvopaplavasiṃha ("The Lion that Devours All Categories"/"The Upsetting of All Principles"), has been seen as an important Ajñana philosopher.

In the Chandogya Upanishad, Aruni asks metaphysical questions concerning the nature of reality and truth, observes constant change, and asks if there is something that is eternal and unchanging. From these questions, embedded in a dialogue with his son, he presents the concept of Ātman (soul, Self) and universal Self.

The Ashtavakra Gita, credited to Aṣṭāvakra, examines the metaphysical nature of existence and the meaning of individual freedom, presenting its thesis that there is only one Supreme Reality (Brahman), the entirety of universe is oneness and manifestation of this reality, everything is interconnected, all Self (Atman, soul) are part of that one, and that individual freedom is not the end point but a given, a starting point, innate.

The first book of Yoga Vasistha, attributed to Valmiki, presents Rama's frustration with the nature of life, human suffering and disdain for the world. The second describes, through the character of Rama, the desire for liberation and the nature of those who seek such liberation. The fourth describes the nature of world and many non-dualism ideas with numerous stories. It emphasizes free will and human creative power.

Ancient Mīmāṃsā's central concern was epistemology (pramana), that is what are the reliable means to knowledge. It debated not only "how does man ever learn or know, whatever he knows", but also whether the nature of all knowledge is inherently circular, whether those such as foundationalists who critique the validity of any "justified beliefs" and knowledge system make flawed presumptions of the very premises they critique, and how to correctly interpret and avoid incorrectly interpreting dharma texts such as the Vedas. To Mīmānsā scholars, the nature of non-empirical knowledge and human means to it are such that one can never demonstrate certainty, one can only falsify knowledge claims, in some cases.

Buddhist philosophy's main concern is soteriological, defined as freedom from dukkha (unease). Because ignorance to the true nature of things is considered one of the roots of suffering, Buddhist thinkers concerned themselves with philosophical questions related to epistemology and the use of reason. Dukkha can be translated as "incapable of satisfying," "the unsatisfactory nature and the general insecurity of all conditioned phenomena"; or "painful." Prajñā is insight or knowledge of the true nature of existence. The Buddhist tradition regards ignorance (avidyā), a fundamental ignorance, misunderstanding or mis-perception of the nature of reality, as one of the basic causes of dukkha and samsara. By overcoming ignorance or misunderstanding one is enlightened and liberated. This overcoming includes awakening to impermanence and the non-self nature of reality, and this develops dispassion for the objects of clinging, and liberates a being from dukkha and saṃsāra. Pratītyasamutpāda, also called "dependent arising, or dependent origination", is the Buddhist theory to explain the nature and relations of being, becoming, existence and ultimate reality. Buddhism asserts that there is nothing independent, except the state of nirvana. All physical and mental states depend on and arise from other pre-existing states, and in turn from them arise other dependent states while they cease.

=== Chinese Philosophies ===
Confucianism considers the ordinary activities of human life—and especially human relationships—as a manifestation of the sacred, because they are the expression of humanity's moral nature (xìng 性), which has a transcendent anchorage in Heaven (Tiān 天) and unfolds through an appropriate respect for the spirits or gods (shén) of the world. Tiān (天), a key concept in Chinese thought, refers to the God of Heaven, the northern culmen of the skies and its spinning stars, earthly nature and its laws which come from Heaven, to "Heaven and Earth" (that is, "all things"), and to the awe-inspiring forces beyond human control. Confucius used the term in a mystical way. It is similar to what Taoists meant by Dao: "the way things are" or "the regularities of the world", which Stephan Feuchtwang equates with the ancient Greek concept of physis, "nature" as the generation and regenerations of things and of the moral order. Feuchtwang explains that the difference between Confucianism and Taoism primarily lies in the fact that the former focuses on the realisation of the starry order of Heaven in human society, while the latter on the contemplation of the Dao which spontaneously arises in nature.

== Modern science and laws of nature: trying to avoid metaphysics ==
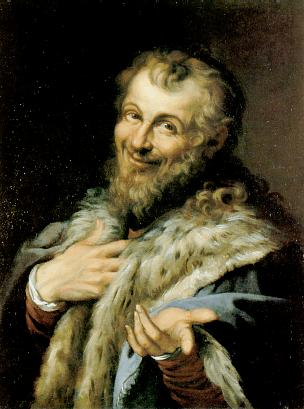
A Renaissance imagined representation of Democritus, the laughing philosopher, by Agostino Carracci

In contrast, Modern Science took its distinctive turn with Francis Bacon, who rejected the four distinct causes, and saw Aristotle as someone who "did proceed in such a spirit of difference and contradiction towards all antiquity: undertaking not only to frame new words of science at pleasure, but to confound and extinguish all ancient wisdom". He felt that lesser known Greek philosophers such as Democritus "who did not suppose a mind or reason in the frame of things", have been arrogantly dismissed because of Aristotelianism leading to a situation in his time wherein "the search of the physical causes hath been neglected, and passed in silence".

And so Bacon advised...

Physic doth make inquiry, and take consideration of the same natures : but how? Only as to the material and efficient causes of them, and not as to the forms. For example; if the cause of whiteness in snow or froth be inquired, and it be rendered thus, that the subtile intermixture of air and water is the cause, it is well rendered; but, nevertheless, is this the form of whiteness? No; but it is the efficient, which is ever but vehiculum formæ. This part of metaphysique I do not find laboured and performed...

— Francis Bacon, Advancement of Learning II.VII.6

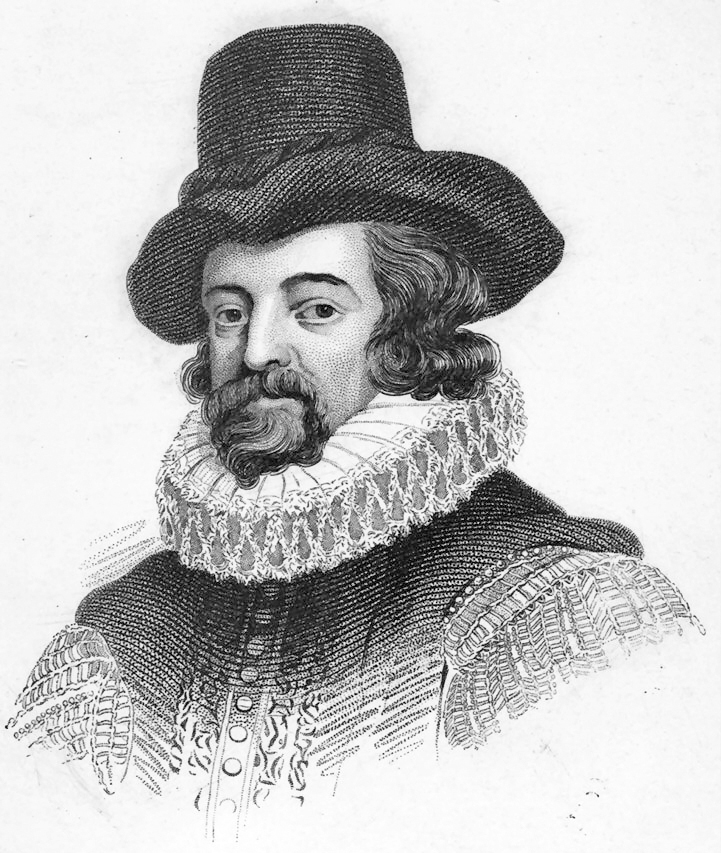
Francis Bacon

In his Novum Organum Bacon argued that the only forms or natures we should hypothesize are the "simple" (as opposed to compound) ones such as the ways in which heat, movement, etc. work. For example, in aphorism 51 he writes:

51. The human understanding is, by its own nature, prone to abstraction, and supposes that which is fluctuating to be fixed. But it is better to dissect than abstract nature; such was the method employed by the school of Democritus, which made greater progress in penetrating nature than the rest. It is best to consider matter, its conformation, and the changes of that conformation, its own action, and the law of this action or motion, for forms are a mere fiction of the human mind, unless you will call the laws of action by that name.

Following Bacon's advice, the scientific search for the formal cause of things is now replaced by the search for "laws of nature" or "laws of physics" in all scientific thinking. To use Aristotle's well-known terminology these are descriptions of efficient cause, and not formal cause or final cause. It means modern science limits its hypothesizing about non-physical things to the assumption that there are regularities to the ways of all things which do not change.

These general laws, in other words, replace thinking about specific "laws", for example "human nature". In modern science, human nature is part of the same general scheme of cause and effect, obeying the same general laws, as all other things. The above-mentioned difference between accidental and substantial properties, and indeed knowledge and opinion, also disappear within this new approach that aimed to avoid metaphysics.

As Bacon knew, the term "laws of nature" was one taken from medieval Aristotelianism. St Thomas Aquinas for example, defined law so that nature really was legislated to consciously achieve aims, like human law: "an ordinance of reason for the common good, made by him who has care of the community and promulgated". In contrast, roughly contemporary with Bacon, Hugo Grotius described the law of nature as "a rule that [can] be deduced from fixed principles by a sure process of reasoning". And later still, Montesquieu was even further from the original legal metaphor, describing laws vaguely as "the necessary relations deriving from the nature of things".

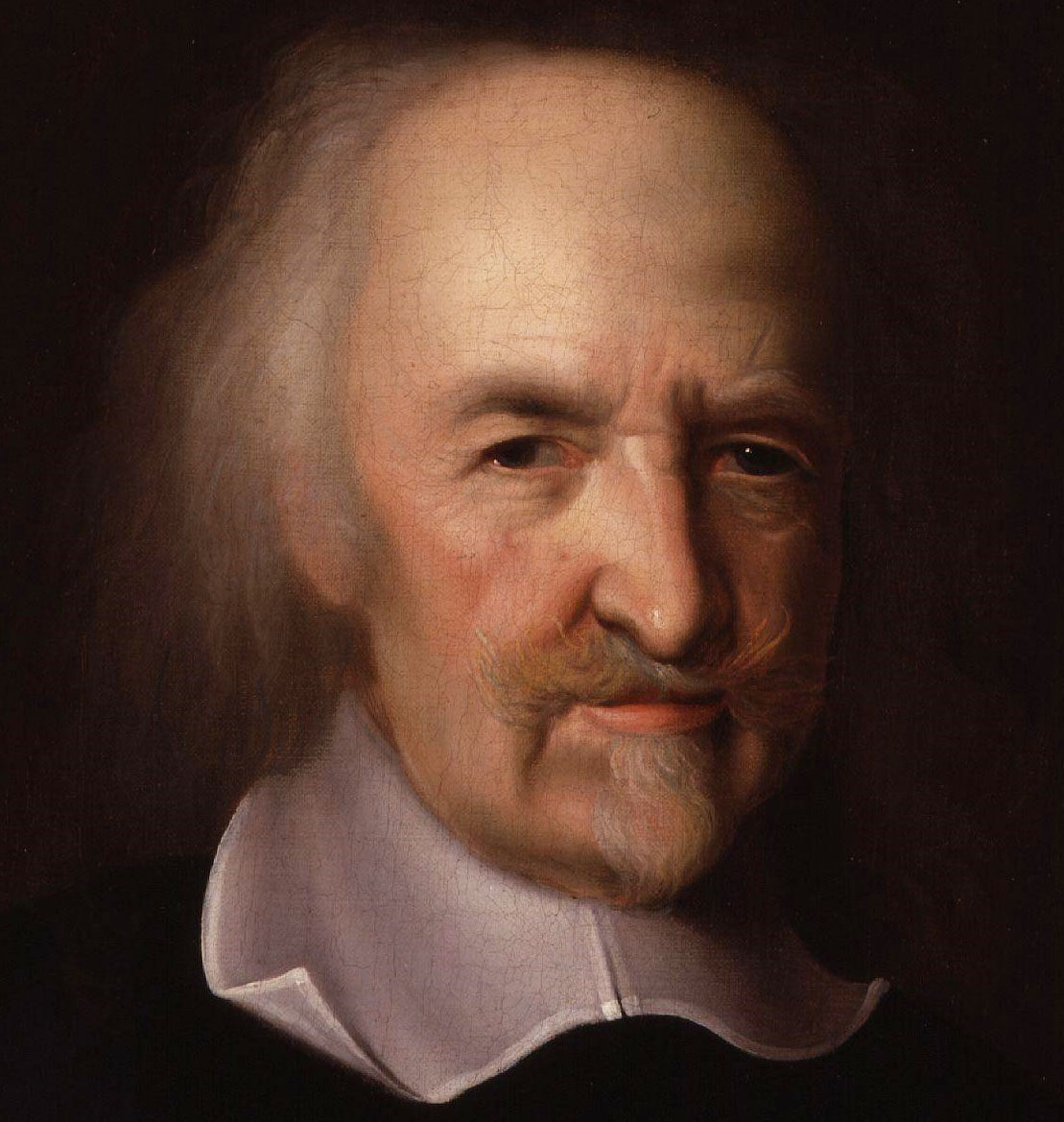
Thomas Hobbes

One of the most important implementors of Bacon's proposal was Thomas Hobbes, whose remarks concerning nature are particularly well-known. His most famous work, Leviathan, opens with the word "Nature" and then parenthetically defines it as "the art whereby God hath made and governes the world". Despite this pious description, he follows a Baconian approach. Following his contemporary, Descartes, Hobbes describes life itself as mechanical, caused in the same way as clockwork:

For seeing life is but a motion of Limbs, the beginning whereof is in some principall part within; why may we not say, that all Automata (Engines that move themselves by springs and wheeles as doth a watch) have an artificiall life?

On this basis, already being established in natural science in his lifetime, Hobbes sought to discuss politics and human life in terms of "laws of nature". But in the new modern approach of Bacon and Hobbes, and before them Machiavelli (who however never clothed his criticism of the Aristotelian approach in medieval terms like "laws of nature"), such laws of nature are quite different to human laws: they no longer imply any sense of better or worse, but simply how things really are, and, when in reference to laws of human nature, what sorts of human behavior can be most relied upon.

== "Late modern" nature ==
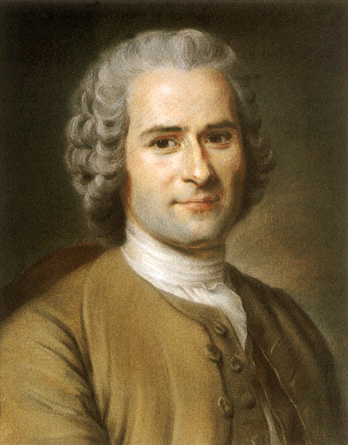
Jean-Jacques Rousseau: a civilized man, but a person who questioned whether civilization was according to human nature.

Having disconnected the term "law of nature" from the original medieval metaphor of human-made law, the term "law of nature" is now used less than in early modern times.

To take the critical example of human nature, as discussed in ethics and politics, once early modern philosophers such as Hobbes had described human nature as whatever you could expect from a mechanism called a human, the point of speaking of human nature became problematic in some contexts.

In the late 18th century, Rousseau took a critical step in his Second Discourse, reasoning that human nature as we know it, rational, and with language, and so on, is a result of historical accidents, and the specific up-bringing of an individual. The consequences of this line of reasoning were to be enormous. It was all about the question of nature. In effect it was being claimed that human nature, one of the most important types of nature in Aristotelian thinking, did not exist as it had been understood to exist.

== The survival of metaphysics ==
The approach of modern science, like the approach of Aristotelianism, is apparently not universally accepted by all people who accept the concept of nature as a reality which we can pursue with reason.

Bacon and other opponents of Metaphysics claim that all attempts to go beyond nature are bound to fall into the same errors, but Metaphysicians themselves see differences between different approaches.

Immanuel Kant for example, expressed the need for a Metaphysics in quite similar terms to Aristotle.

...though we cannot know these objects as things in themselves, we must yet be in a position at least to think them as things in themselves; otherwise we should be landed in the absurd conclusion that there can be appearance without anything that appears.

— Critique of Pure Reason pp. Bxxvi-xxvii

As in Aristotelianism then, Kantianism claims that the human mind must itself have characteristics which are beyond nature, metaphysical, in some way. Specifically, Kant argued that the human mind comes ready-made with a priori programming, so to speak, which allows it to make sense of nature.

== The study of nature without metaphysics ==
Authors from Nietzsche to Richard Rorty have claimed that science, the study of nature, can and should exist without metaphysics. But this claim has always been controversial. Authors like Bacon and Hume never denied that their use of the word "nature" implied metaphysics, but tried to follow Machiavelli's approach of talking about what works, instead of claiming to understand what seems impossible to understand.

== See also ==
- A priori and a posteriori
- Aristotelianism
- Causality
- Empiricism
- Human nature
- Idealism
- Metaphysical naturalism
- Natural philosophy
- Nature
- Saṃsāra
- Naturphilosophie
- Philosophical naturalism
- Platonism
- Reality
- Truth
