= Debiprasad Chattopadhyaya =

Indian Marxist philosopher (1918–1993)

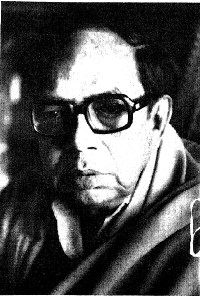
- Born: 19 November 1918; Calcutta, British India
- Died: 8 May 1993 (aged 74); Calcutta, India

Education
- Education: University of Calcutta
- Doctoral advisor: Surendranath Dasgupta

Philosophical work
- Era: 20th-century philosophy
- Region: Indian philosophy, Continental philosophy
- School: Lokayata; Materialism; Empiricism; Atheism; Marxism
- Main interests: History of Indian Materialism and Science; Political philosophy
- Notable works: Lokayata: A Study in Ancient Indian Materialism
- Notable ideas: Irreligiosity of Early Vedism

Debiprasad Chattopadhyaya (19 November 1918 – 8 May 1993) was an Indian Marxist philosopher. He made contributions to the exploration of the materialist current in ancient Indian philosophy. He is known for Lokayata: A Study in Ancient Indian Materialism, which is his exposition of the philosophy of Lokayata. He is also known for work on history of science and scientific method in ancient India, especially his 1977 book Science and Society in Ancient India on the ancient physicians Charaka and Sushruta. He was awarded the Padma Bhushan, India's third highest civilian honour, posthumously, in 1998.

== Biography ==
Debiprasad Chattopadhyaya was born on 19 November 1918 in Calcutta. His father was a supporter of India's freedom struggle. It was probably his influence that initiated Debiprasad to two major passions in his life – Indian philosophy and politics; he quickly progressed towards radical streams in both fields, developing a lifelong commitment to Marxism and communist movement. At a very early stage of his life Chattopadhyaya immersed himself in the left nationalist movement by joining the Association of Progressive Writers, which was formed in 1936.

Debiprasad Chattopadhyaya obtained his academic training in philosophy in Calcutta, West Bengal under eminent philosophers like Sarvapalli Radhakrishnan and S. N. Dasgupta. After standing first in philosophy at University of Calcutta both in B.A. (1939) and M.A. (1942), he did his post-graduate research work under Prof S. N. Dasgupta. He taught philosophy at the City College of Calcutta for three decades. Subsequently, he was appointed a UGC Visiting Professor at the universities of Andhra Pradesh, Calcutta and Poona. He remained associated with the activities of the Indian Council of Historical Research (ICHR), Indian Council of Philosophical Research (ICPHR) and the National Institute of Science, Technology and Development Studies (NISTADS) of the Council of Scientific & Industrial Research (CSIR) under various capacities. His second wife was the renowned educationist and Tibetologist, Dr. Alaka Majumder Chattopadhyaya (1926–1998).

Debiprasad Chattopadhyaya's work on materialism and scientific method led to his active interactions with the international community of philosophers, historians and Indologists. He collaborated with some of the outstanding western scholars of the 20th century, like Joseph Needham, George Thomson, Bongard Levin and Walter Ruben. He was fellow of the German and USSR Academies of Sciences.

He died in Calcutta on 8 May 1993.

== Major works ==
=== Lokayata: A Study in Ancient Indian Materialism (1959) ===
In his writings, Debiprasad Chattopadhyaya aimed to illuminate science and materialism in ancient India, and to trace their evolution. While commenting on his work on Lokayata, German indologist Walter Ruben called him a "thought-reformer", who was "conscious of his great responsibility towards his people living in a period of struggle for national awakening and of world-wide fighting for the forces of materialism, progress, humanism and peace against imperialism. He has written this book Lokayata: A Study in Ancient Indian Materialism against the old fashioned conception that India was and is the land of dreamers and mystics".

This study questioned the mainstream view that Indian philosophy's sole concern was the concept of Brahman. "From the scattered references in the ancient philosophical literature which were completely hostile to the ancient materialist schools, Debiprasad Chattopadhyaya reconstructed the philosophy of Lokayata, which consistently denied the existence of brahman and viewed pratyaksa (perception) as the sole means of knowledge. He demolished the so-called "interpretation of synthesis" which sought to combine the diverse philosophical traditions of India to form a ladder that leads to the philosophy of Advaita Vedanta.

Being a Marxist, Chattopadhyaya's uses the method of historical materialism to study "the ultimate material basis of the primitive deha-vada and the primitive rituals related to it" and to reveal how these could "be connected with the mode of securing the material means of subsistence". He also traced "the course of development this archaic outlook eventually underwent".

=== Indian Philosophy: A Popular Outline (1964) ===
It was an introductory book that examined Indian philosophy through an interdisciplinary approach, drawing on anthropological, economic and philological studies. The book traced the philosophical development in India from the Vedic period to later Buddhism. In this introductory study, Debiprasad Chattopadhyaya targets another important myth that overshadows the study of Indian philosophy – that of the presupposed predominance of shastrartha or textual interpretation. He views the development of Indian philosophy as the consequence of real clashes of ideas – "contradiction constituted the moving force behind the Indian philosophical development". Dale Riepe in his review of this book says that Chattopadhyaya "combines the analytic sagacity of Hume with the impatient realism of Lenin".

=== Indian Atheism: A Marxist Analysis (1969) ===
This is yet another provocative critique of the standard accounts of Indian philosophy and religion. This book brings out a coherent historical account of atheism in India. In fact, according to Chattopadhyaya, "an unbiased survey of the Vedas clearly shows the total absence of religious consciousness in its earlier stage and the Rgveda is full of relics of this stage of thought. Even the world polytheism is misapplied to such an early stage of the Vedic thought".

=== What is Living and What is Dead in Indian Philosophy (1976) ===
In the Preface, Debiprasad Chattopadhyaya says his purpose in this book is to present "an analysis of our philosophical traditions from the standpoint of our present philosophical requirements. These requirements, as understood here, are secularism, rationalism and science-orientation". He once again finds the philosophical development – debates and clashes – in ancient India embedded in the class struggles of the time. He discusses the materialist foundation of Vedic rituals, which he finds similar to the magical belief of controlling the natural forces through yajnas, etc. He shows how these rites and rituals that evolved as primitive scientific endeavours were transformed into superstitions and monopolies in the hands of the oppressors with the advent of class divisions.

The book also endeavours to demonstrate how Indian philosophy was not any exception to the sharp conflicts between idealism and materialism, which are universally evident in the philosophical traditions of other regions. Further, it considers the role of the law-givers like Manu in establishing the supremacy of the idealist traditions, and how due to the censor and censure anti-idealists like Varahamihira and Brahmagupta worked out their philosophies in distinctive Aesopian language, developing their own modes of camouflaging their ideas.

Like elsewhere, in India too anti-idealists and materialists took practice as the main criterion of truth. Nyaya-Vaisheshikas were most outspoken in this regard, "after a knowledge is proved true in practice, there remains no doubt about the proof; hence the question of proving does not arise". On the other hand, the idealists believed in complete separation between theory and practice. They adhered to, in the words of Kumarila Bhatta, the principle of bahyartha-sunyatva (the unreality of the objects of knowledge), which, according to Debiprasad Chattopadhyaya, formed "the real pivot of idealism throughout its Indian career".

=== Science and Society in Ancient India (1977) ===
This book is about scientific method in ancient India and how societal divisions of the time shaped the development of science. Debiprasad Chattopadhyaya chooses the field of medicine for the purpose, because, according to him, "the only discipline that promises to be fully secular and contains clear potentials of the modern understanding of natural science is medicine".

The main concentration of the book is to present an analysis of Caraka Samhita, the crucial source book on Indian medicine. According to Chattopadhyaya, "discarding scripture orientation, they [the Indian physicians] insist on the supreme importance of direct observation of natural phenomena and on the technique of rational processing of the empirical data. They go even to the extent of claiming that the truth of any conclusion thus arrived at is to be tested ultimately by the criterion of practice". For them, "everything in nature occurs according to some immutable laws, the body of which is usually called svabhava in Indian thought" and "from the medical viewpoint there can be nothing which is not made of matter". They even say that "a substance is called conscious when it is endowed with the sense-organs". Further, Chattopadhyaya shows:

"If anywhere in ancient Indian thought we are permitted to see the real anticipation of the view that knowledge is power – which, when further worked out, assumes the formulation that freedom is the recognition of necessity – it is to be found among the practitioners of the healing art".

Chattopadhyaya also tries to show in the book, how societal divisions, especially the caste system, which was enforced by the law-givers and their justificatory idealist ideologies, formed obstructions in the way of scientific development in India.

=== Lenin, the Philosopher (1979) ===
This book was written in the context of growing state authoritarianism during the Indian Emergency declared by Indira Gandhi, on the one hand, and the upsurge of rightist forces in the form of Jan Sangh, Shiv Sena etc., on the other. Chattopadhyaya opined "that in these grim and anxious days through which India today is passing, that which holds hope for our future is the growing awareness of our people of socialism being the only way out". And, "an essential pre-condition for moving forward to Socialism is the consolidation of Socialist consciousness in its right sense among the Indians today", for which "it is imperative to understand and absorb the philosophical views of Lenin".

This book is meant to be a "guide or introduction" to Lenin's philosophical writings. It seeks "to lead the readers to the actual study of Lenin, providing them with some clarifications, annotations and summations that they may be useful only for the limited of a preliminary acquaintance with Lenin's philosophical ideas".

Communist leader E.M.S. Namboodiripad in his overall appreciative review of the book criticised Chattopadhyaya for not explaining "in a sufficiently convincing way as to why Lenin thought it necessary to go to Hegel in his later years", as evident from his Philosophical Notebooks of 1914.

== Reception ==
Gerald Larson sees Chattopadhyaya's writings on ancient Indian philosophies as the most interesting and sustained Marxist interpretation of Indian thought. Reviewing Chattopadhyaya's writings on Samkhya philosophy he observes, "Chattopadhyaya proceeds to reconstruct what the original Samkhya position was, claiming that the classical notion did not include Purusha, and that the most important notion in the Samkhya is Prakrti, citing pre-Vedic Tantra traditions of a matriarchal society to be the foundation of original Samkhya." But disagreeing with this conclusion of Chattopadhyaya he says, "To argue... for an archaic agricultural-matriarchal tradition of mother-right and a pastoral-patriarchal tradition of male dominance and then to trace in a direct one-to-one correlation of a Samkhya materialism to the former and a Vedanta idealism to the latter is clearly an oversimplification that reflects Chattopadhyaya's political ideology more than it does India's ancient cultural heritage." Concluding the review Larson avers "what begins as a refreshing anthropological methodology for studying ancient thought and culture is reduced to an ideological perspective designed to show that... private property and the state machinery are not eternal adjuncts to human existence..." and that "...the spiritualistic outlook is not innate in man".

Johannes Quack, in his preface to the book Indian Atheism: A Marxist Analysis, writes, "This book is based on the awareness that the Indian struggle for socialism today is related to the struggle for the Indian philosophical heritage." Chattopadhaya is, he says, convinced that an analysis of philosophical materials of India will lead, "if rightly followed," to Marxism in India. He calls the book the "most powerful ideological weapon" to "destroy the fiction of Indian wisdom being essentially God oriented.". Reviewing the same book Dale Riepe calls it the most complete study of its kind; "its special importance lies in its iconoclasm toppling the idols of European and Indian accounts of early Indian religion and philosophy". He notes that the book ends with "another 140 pages of text with staggering load of argument that will make rationalists and theists alike somewhat dizzy". Noticing that Chattopadhyaya's book is markedly different from the mainstream scholarship on Indian philosophy he calls it "a work almost unique in the history of Indian philosophy".

In his book Indian Philosophy Since Independence, Dale Riepe calls Debiprasad's Lokayata "a work of originality and world significance...a fully-founded work showing the philosophical implications of historical considerations." Chattopadhyaya is a proponent of historical and dialectical materialism, writes Riepe, and Chattopadhyaya's book, according to Riepe, is a classic. Giving an overview of Debiprasad's other books Riepe writes, "These indications of the herculean efforts of Debiprasad are earnest tokens of his awareness of the great work still to be done for Indian philosophy. Although he has planted almost alone in the Indian fields, others are slowly harvesting the results at home and abroad where his renown is exceeding many of the leading idealists".

According to Chattopadhyaya, states Riepe, "Buddha looked backwards to the tribal collectives and wanted to revive... the imaginary substance of the tribe...". According to Dale Riepe, "Chattopadhyaya claims most of the ancient Indian traditional philosophers were atheists", and contrasting the approach taken by Debiprasad with the approach taken by followers of modern Western idealism like S.N. Dasgupta, Riepe writes:

Debiprasad's approach here is based on anthropological and archaeological findings, in sharp contrast to the mythopoeic constructions of the revivalists and Indian philosophers following the lead of modern Western idealism. Debiprasad's approach, in contrast to his teacher, Surendranath Dasgupta, is not simply ideological, conceptual and literary, as fine a work as Dasgupta has achieved, it is bound to the idealistic viewpoint even when he uses important physical data. Debiprasad stresses the need to establish the historical account of Indian thought on the basis of an objective and scientific approach. This implies the use of all relevant scientific methods and scientific knowledge in order to explain the rise of Indian philosophy and interpret its significance in the history of India.

The various publications of Chattopadhyaya on Carvaka/Lokayata have been praised as pioneering and important contributions to the studies by Ramakrishna Bhattacharya. However, Bhattacharya also questions Chattopadhyaya analysis. For example, Ramkrishna Bhattacharya states, "Chattopadhyaya did not deny Ajita Kesakambali was a materialist, but chose to emphasize that 'Ajita was no less a philosopher of futility and moral collapse than the Buddha, Mahavira, Purana and Pakudha [...]". Bhattacharya notes that "Chattopadhyaya brands Ajita's teachings as a philosophy of the graveyard".

Chattopadhyaya's rational reconstruction of the history of Indian materialism in Lokayata: A Study in Ancient Indian Materialism and other texts, was one of the most significant contributions, states Rajendra Prasad. Chattopadhyaya's pursuit, notes Prasad, was "a result of much of his commitment to values of scholarship" as to the "communist movement" in India. His efforts to explain materialism and atheism in Indian philosophy in its antiquity, against the old fashioned conception that India was and is the land of dreamers and mystics, required "tremendous intellectual courage", yet "Chattopadhyaya never flinched in the face of isolation in his own profession".

Endorsing the book Lokayata Joseph Needham wrote: "Your book will have a truly treasured place on my shelves. It is truly extraordinary that we should have approached ancient Chinese and ancient Indian civilisations with such similar results...." About Chattopadhayay's 1977 book, Science and Society in Ancient India, he said: "I feel that you have entirely proved your case that the Caraka-samhita and the Susruta-samhita have an ambiguous character, which, when dissected, reveals the intense struggle between the theological philosophers on the one hand, and the doctors who strove for a truly scientific view of the world, on the other. It is unmistakably a chapter in the 'warfare of science with religion'...I do feel that your philological and philosophical analysis has been here a really splendid contribution."

Commenting on Chattopadhyaya's book Lokayata, Louis Renou wrote: "The book is of definite value and deserves to be carefully studied by Indologists and sociologists."

Eli Franco called Chattopadhyaya's work on the history of Indian philosophy "Marxist science fiction," noting, among other things, Chattopadhyaya's ignorance of the materialism of Jayarashi Bhatta, the great Indian skeptic.

== Bibliography ==
=== Books ===
- Lokayata: A Study in Ancient Indian Materialism (1959) New Delhi: People's Publishing House.
- Indian Philosophy: A Popular Introduction (1964) New Delhi: People's Publishing House.
- Indian Atheism: A Marxist Analysis (1969) Calcutta: Manisha.
- What is Living and What is Dead in Indian Philosophy (1976 ) New Delhi: People's Publishing House.
- Two Trends in Indian Philosophy (1977).Prasaranga, University of Mysore.
- Lenin, the Philosopher (1979) New Delhi: Sterling Publishers.
- An Encyclopaedia of South Indian Culture (1983, with G. Ramakrishna & N. Gayathri) Calcutta: K.P. Bagchi.
- Knowledge and intervention:Studies in society and consciousness(1985) Calcutta: Firma KLM
- History of Science and Technology in Ancient India Volume 1: The Beginnings (1986) Calcutta: Firma KLM.
- Religion and Society (1987). Bangalore:Navakarnataka Publications.
- In Defence of Materialism in Ancient India (1989) New Delhi: People's Publishing House.
- History of Science and Technology in Ancient India Volume 2: Formation of the Theoretical Fundamentals of Natural Science (1991) Calcutta:Firma KLM.
- History of Science and Technology in Ancient India Volume 3: Astronomy, Science and Society (1996) Calcutta:Firma KLM.
- Musings in Ideology- An Anthology of Analytical Essays by Debiprasad Chattopadhyaya (2002) G. Ramakrishna and Sanjay K. Biswas (Eds) Bangalore: Navakarnataka Publications Pvt. Ltd.

=== Articles ===
- Making of Astronomy in Ancient India, in Cosmic Perspectives (1989) edited by Biswas, Mallik and Vishveshwara. Cambridge: Cambridge University Press.

=== Lectures ===
- "On the Alleged Unity of Religions" S. Radhakrishnan Memorial Lecture (1992). Indian Institute of Advanced Study.

=== Books edited ===
- Taranatha’s History of Buddhism in India, Translated by Lama Chimpa and Alka Chattopadhyaya. (1970) Delhi: Motilal Banarsidass. ISBN 81-208-0696-4
- Indian Studies: Past and Present, 1969-1970 (1970) Scholarly Publications. ISBN 978-0880650410
- History and Society: Essays in Honour of Professor Niharranjan Ray (1978) Calcutta
- Studies in the History of Indian Philosophy: An anthology of articles by scholars Eastern and Western. In 2 Volumes. (1978). K.P. Bagchi and Company
- The History of Botany and Allied Sciences in India (c. 2000 B.C. to 100 A.D.) (1982) New Delhi: Editorial Enterprise.
- Studies in the History of Science in India. In 2 Volumes. (1983) New Delhi: Editorial Enterprises.
- Carvaka/Lokayata : An Anthology of Source Materials and Some Recent Studies (1994) New Delhi: Indian Council of Philosophical Research.

=== Other works ===
- Philosophy, Science, and Social Progress: Essays in honour of Debiprasad Chattopadhyaya (ed. Suman Gupta and Hiltrud Rustau)(1992) New Delhi: People's Publishing House.
- Nyaya: Gautama's Nyaya-sutra, with Vatsyayana's Commentary. Translated by Mrinalkanti Gangopadhyaya, with an introduction by Debiprasad Chattopadhyaya (1982) Calcutta: Indian Studies.
