= A. H. Salunkhe =

Sanskrit scholar, theologian, Marathi author, and social activist from Maharashtra, India

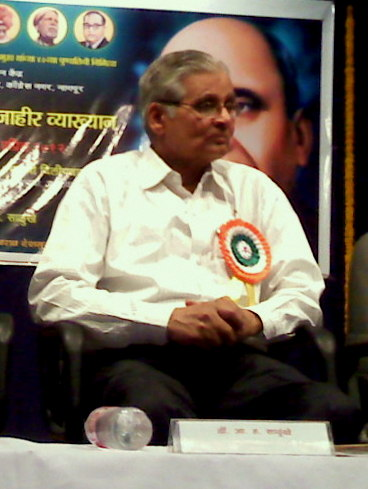
Dr. A. H. Salunkhe in April 2012

A. H. Salunkhe is a Marathi author and social activist related to Satya Shodhak Samaj and to the Shivdharma movement.

He was the president of Maharashtra State Cultural Policy, 2010.

== Early life ==
Born in a small farmer family at Khadewadi in Sangli district, he completed his graduation from Shivaji Vidyapeeth with a doctorate in Sanskrit. He worked as a Head of Department at a college in Satara. He was art faculty dean at the Shivaji University, Kolhapur.

Salunkhe was awarded the Bhai Madhavrao Bagal award in 2007, instituted by the Madhavraoji Bagal Vidhyapeeth, Kolhapur.
