= Ramkrishna Bhattacharya =

Indian scholar (1947–2022)

Ramkrishna Bhattacarya
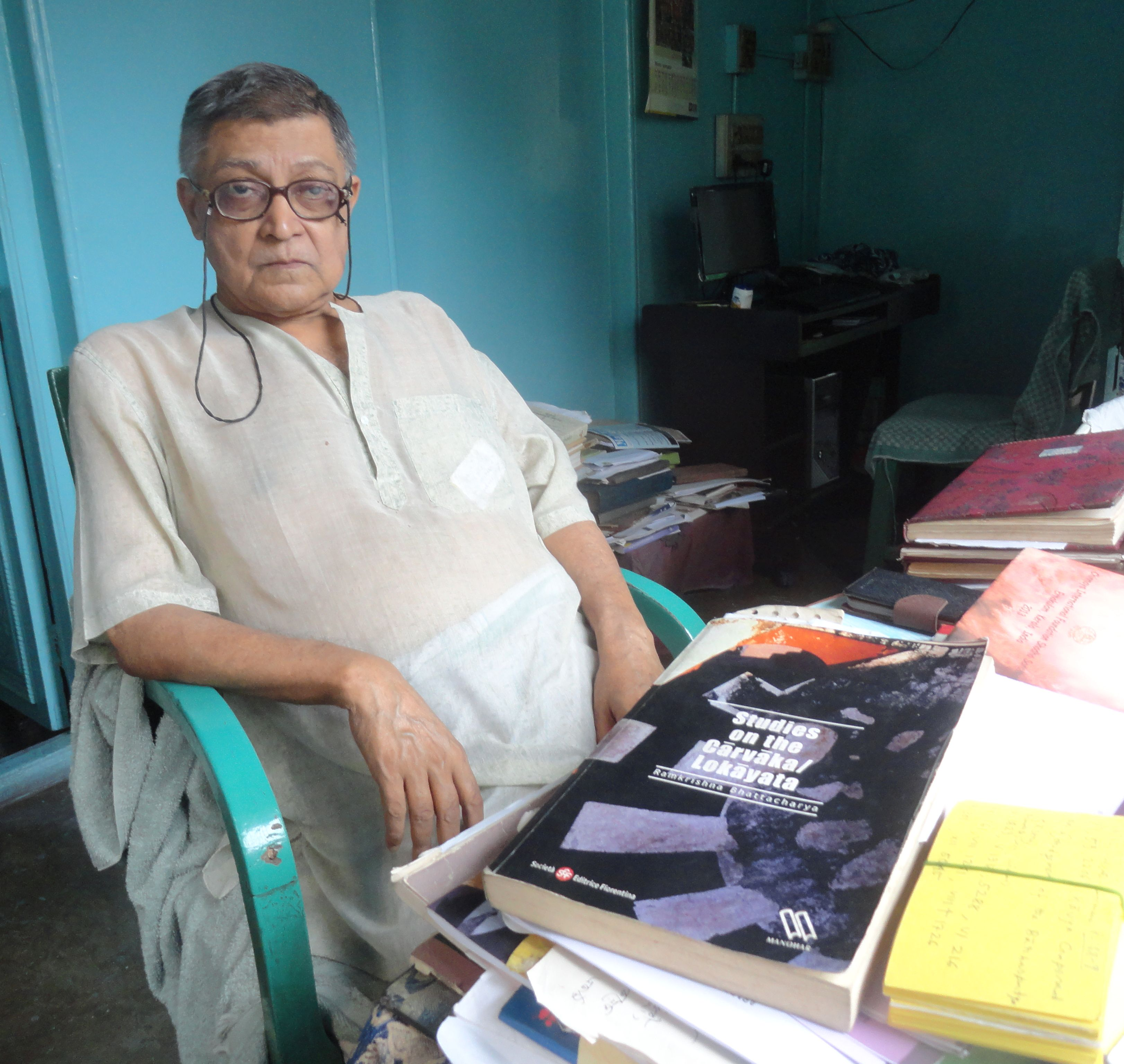
- Born: 10 December 1947; Kolkata, India
- Died: 2 October 2022 (aged 74); Kolkata, West Bengal, India

Philosophical work
- Era: 20th-century philosophy
- School: Lokayata; Materialism; Empiricism; Atheism; Marxism
- Main interests: History of Indian materialism and science; Political philosophy
- Notable ideas: Carvaka and Pre-Carvaka materialism in ancient India

Ramkrishna Bhattacharya was an academic author and exponent of an ancient school of Indian materialism called Carvaka/Lokayata.

He authored 27 books and more than 175 research papers on Indian and European literature, textual criticism (Bangla and Sanskrit), the history of science in India, the history of modern India, and philosophy - particularly on the Carvaka/Lokayata system, materialism and rationalism.

== Biography ==
Ramkrishna Bhattacharya was born on 10 December 1947 in Calcutta. He did his B.A (Hons.in English) (1966), M.A (1968), and Ph.D. (1986) from University of Calcutta.

He was Reader, Department of English, Ananda Mohan College, Kolkata, from where he retired on 31 December 2007. He was also a Guest Lecturer, Post-Graduate Studies in English, University College of Arts and Commerce, University of Calcutta, Kolkata (retired after 2006-07 session).

He was an Emeritus Fellow in English, University Grants Commission, New Delhi during 2009-2011 and a visiting professor, Indian Council of Philosophical Research, New Delhi, during 2009–10.

He was a Fellow of Pavlov Institute, Kolkata, West Bengal.

Ramkrishna Bhattacharya died on 2 October 2022 in Kolkata.

== Major works ==
=== Studies on the Carvaka/Lokayata (2009) ===
It is a scientific study of the Carvaka/Lokayata, the materialist system of philosophy that flourished in ancient India between the eighth and twelfth centuries CE, and which has since disappeared. Despite the paucity of material relating to the Carvaka, a reconstruction of its basic tenets reveals it to be the lone contender standing against the perceived binary of pro-Vedic Brahminical schools on the one hand, and the non-Vedic Buddhist and Jain schools on the other.

This study seeks to disprove certain notions about the Carvaka/Lokayata, particularly that the Carvakas did not approve of any instrument of cognition other than perception, and that they advocated unalloyed sensualism and hedonism. In contrast, this book offers evidence to show that the Carvakas, despite their difference of opinion in other areas, did admit inference in so far as it was grounded on perception. The author argues that the common belief that "all materialists are nothing but sensualists" is a misconception, as no authentic Carvaka aphorism have been cited by the movement's opponents to support this charge.

This study also seeks to establish the fact that a pre-Carvaka school of materialism existed in India, although there is no way to prove that the Carvaka system grew out of it. Yet if the evidence provided by the Manimekalai - and indirectly supported by Mahabharata - is admitted, it could be suggested that the two schools existed simultaneously.

== Bibliography ==
=== Books/Printed lectures in English ===
- Grounds for Hope. Allahabad: Indian Academy of Social Sciences, 2005.
- Studies on the Carvaka/Lokayata. Florence: Societa Editrice Fiorentina, 2009. Indian reprint: New Delhi: Manohar Books, 2010. London: Anthem Press, 2011. Indian reprint: Anthem Press India, 2012.
- Emergence of Materialism in India (Two lectures delivered at the Centre for Scientific Socialism, published in its Occasional Lecture Series-9). Nagarjuna Nagar (Guntur, Aandhra Pradesh 522510): K. R. R. Mohan Rao Centre for Scientific Socialism. Nagarjun Nagar: Acharya Nagarjuna University, 2013.
- Brahmabandhav Upadhyay: Restless Patriot and Theologian. Kolkata: K.P.Bagchi, 2016.
- Reflections on the Commentary Tradition in India (Prof. K. Satchidananda Murty Memorial Lecture-7 delivered at the Prof. K. Satchidananda Murty Centre for Studies in Afro-Asian Philosophies), Nagarjuna Nagar (Guntur, Aandhra Pradesh 522510), Nagarjun Nagar: Acharya Nagarjuna University, 2018.
- The Origin of Geometry in India: A Study in the Sulbasutras. New Castle on Tyne: Cambridge Scholars Publishing, 2019.
- More Studies on the Carvaka/Lokayata. New Castle on Tyne: Cambridge Scholars Publishing, 2020.

=== Books in Bengali ===
- Brahmana-Roman Catholic Visamvada, Kolkata: Anustup, 1994. [Revised and enlarged second edition, 2011].
- Buddha theke Marx: Rahul Samkrtyaner Abhiyatra, Kolkata: Utthak Prakasani, 1994.[See also item No. 22]
- Anirvan Agnisikha. Bhupendranath Datta: Itihasvodh o Rastracinta. Kolkata: Anustup, 1996. [Revised and enlarged second edition, renamed Bhupendranath Datta: Itihasvodh o Rastracinta, 2013].
- Bertolt Brecht: Prayoger Nandantattva. Kolkata: Anustup, 1999. [Revised and enlarged second edition, 2003, revised reprint 2017].
- Darsan Padar Bhumika. Kolkata: Chayanika, 2003.
- Kamarer Ek Gha. Kolkata: Pavlov Institute, 2003. [Revised and enlarged second edition, 2014]
- Bamla Bhashar Bhut-bhavishyat O Anyanya Prabandha. Kolkata: Ababhas, 2003 [Revised and enlarged second edition, 2008].
- Bamalir Natun Atmaparicay: Samajsamskar theke Svadhinata. Kolkata: Ababhas, 2005. [Revised second edition, 2010].
- Nijer Mukhomukhi. Kolkata: Utsa Manush, 2005.
- Klasik kena chirayata. Kolkata: Korak, 2009f.
- Mananer Murti. Kolkata: Korak, 2010.
- Ore Barnachora Thakur Ela Ityadi Bitarka. Kolkata: Anustup, 2010.
- Charvakacharcha. Kolkata: Sades, 2010.
- Parashuram Galpakar. Kolkata: Ababhas, 2011.
- Parashuramer Charitrasala. Kolkata: Ababhas, 2011
- Vidyasagar: Nana Prasanga. Kolkata: Chirayata, 2011.
- Rabindranather Tin Sangee. Kolkata: Korak, 2011.
- Parashuram Bibidha. Kolkata: Ababhas, 2012.
- Bibhutibhushan o Kathasahitye Bastabbad. Kolkata: Chirayata, 2013.
- Bastubad Jijnasa. Kolkata: Ababhas, 2013.
- Narratology: Chhotogalpa: Chhotoder Galpa. Kolkata: Korak, 2014.
- Bharatvidya o Marksbad : Rahula Sankrityayana o Damodar Kosambi. Kolkata : Utthak Prakashan, 2014 [Incorporating Buddha theke Marx: Rahul Samkrtyaner Abhiyatra, Kolkata: Utthak Prakasani, 1994 (Item No. 2)].
- Itihas: Darsan: Darsaner Itihas. Sushovanchandra Sarkar Smriti Boktrita (Memorial Lecture). Kolkata: Paschimbanga Itihas Samsad, 2014.
- Marxiya Nandantattva. Kolkata: Ababhas, 2015.
- Prabandhasamgraha. Kolkata: Ebong Mushayera, 2015.
- Darsan Parar Bhumika (including Takkatakki karte hale). Dhaka: Dhrubapada, 2015.
- Marxbad Jijnasa. Kolkata: Ababhas, 2016.
- Bankimer Mananjagat. Kolkata: Korak, 2016.
- Takkatakki Korte Hole. Kolkata: Thik-thikana, 2016.
- Bangabhanga:Swadeshi:Biplabbad. Kolkata: K.P. Bagchi, 2016.
- Khola chokhe khola mone. Kolkata: Ritobak, 2018.
- Nirbachita Nibandha. Kolkata: Anustup, 2019.
- Bertolt Brecht-er Galileo-r Jiban. Kolkata: Punascha, 2020.

=== Articles related to the Carvaka/Lokayata ===
- “rnam krtva ghrtam pibet” Who Said This? Journal of Indian Council of Philosophical Research (JICPR), Vol. 14 No. 1, September–December 1996, pp. 170–174.
- Origin of Materialism in India: Patrician or Plebeian? Bharatiya Samajik Chintan (BSC), Vol. 20, No. (1-2), March–June 1997a, pp. 12–23.
- Carvaka/Lokayata Philosophy: Perso-Arabic Sources, Indo-Iranica, Vol. 50 Nos. 1–4, March, June, September & December 1997b [published in Feb. 2000], pp. 85–94.
- Samkhya, Yoga and Lokayata in the Kautiliya Arthasastra: A Review, BSC, Vol. 21 Nos. 1–2, January–June 1998a, pp. 70–74.
- On Lokayata and Lokayatana in Buddhist Sanskrit, Annals of the Bhandarkar Oriental Research Institute (ABORI), Vol. 79, 1998b, pp. 231–235.
- Ramayana-er Gaudiya Pathe Javali Upakhyan (in Bengali), [Vangiya] Sahitya-Parisat-Patrika, Year 103 Nos. 1–4, 1405 B.S. (1998), pp. 182–97.
- What Did the Carvakas Mean by “Sukham Jivet”? Indian Skeptic (IS), Vol. 2 No. 12, April 1999a, pp. 4–8.
- Ajita Kesakambala: Nihilist or Materialist?, Journal of the Asiatic Society (Bengal) (JAS (B)), Vol. 41 No. 1, 1999b, pp. 74–83.
- The Parable of the Wolf's Footprints, IS, Vol. 12 No. 1, 1999c, pp. 31–36.
- Five More Barhaspatya Fragments, IS, Vol. 12 No. 4, 1999d, pp. 16–18.
- On the Authenticity of Two Alleged Carvaka Aphorisms, IS, Vol. 12 No. 5, 1999e, pp. 4–8.
- Paurandarasutra Revisited, Journal of Indian Philosophy (JIP), Vol. 27 No. 5, Oct. 1999f, pp. 485–497.
- “jivika dhatrnirmita” or “jiviketi brhaspatih” ?, JICPR, Vol. 17 No. 1, 1999, pp. 171–176.
- Materialism in India: After Carvaka, IS, Vol. 12 No. 9, 2000a, pp. 31–36.
- Lokayata and Lokayatana in Sanskrit Dictionaries, IS, Vol. 12 No. 11, 2000b, pp. 15–18.
- Perception and Inference in the Carvaka Philosophy, JAS (B), Vol. 42 Nos. 1–2, 2000c (pub. 2001), pp. 29–38.
- The Significance of Lokayata in Pali, Journal of the Department of Pali, Calcutta University (JDPCU), Vol. 10, 2000d, pp. 39–46.
- Yogacara against the Carvaka: A Critical Survey of Tattva-Sangraha, Chapter 22, Anviksa, Vol. 21, Dec. 2000e, pp. 46–55.
- Haribhadra's Saddarsana Samuccaya: Verses 81-84: A Study, JJ, Vol. 36 No. 3, June 2002a, pp. 134–148.
- Jayantabhatta's Representation of the Carvaka: A Critique, Indian Culture: Continuity and Discontinuity, In Memory of Walter Ruben (1899-1982), (Abhandlungen der Leibniz-Sozietat, Band 9), Ed. Joachim Heidrich, Hiltrud Rustau and Diethelm Weidemann, Berlin: trafo verlag, 2002b, pp. 85–93.
- What Does Udayana Mean by lokavyavaharasiddha iti carvakah ?, JICPR, Vol. 14 No. 2, April–June 2002c, pp. 157–160.
- Carvaka Fragments: A New Collection, JIP, Vol. 30 No. 6, December 2002d, pp. 597–640.
- Hemacandra on the Carvaka: A Study, JJ, Vol. 37 No. 3, Jan. 2003a, pp. 133–150.
- A Probable Jain Source for a Verse in Sarva-Darsana-Sangraha, Chapter I, JJ, Vol. 38 No. 1, July 2003b, pp. 30–37.
- Five Basic Tenets of Charvak Philosophy [Synopsis of the lecture delivered to the PG students, research scholars and faculty members of Jain Vishva Bharati Institute, Ladnun, on 12 October 2003], abha, Year 6, Vol. 15, December 2003c, p. 20.
- Jain Sources for the Study of Pre-Carvaka Materialist Ideas in India, JJ, Vol. 38 No. 3, January 2004a, pp. 145–160.
- The Present State of Carvaka/Lokayata Studies: An Overview, Society and Change, Vol. 12 No. 4 [2004b], pp. 5–16.
- New Light on the Carvaka/Lokayata, Sanskritic Studies, Modern Sensibilities. Eds., Didhiti Biswas and Satyajit Layek, Kolkata: UGC-Academic Staff College and Department of Sanskrit, University of Calcutta, 2004c, pp. 47–57.
- What does Vatsyayana Mean by Nastika in the Nyayasutra Commentary? Samskrta-bharati, Journal of the Department of Sanskrit, University of Calcutta, June 2004d (published May 2005), pp.
- What the Carvakas Really Said, Society and Change, Vol. 13 No. 1, April 2005a, pp. 5–15.
- Jain Views on Svabhava: A Survey, JJ, Vol. 40 No. 1, July 2005b, pp. 21–27.
- Various Views on Svabhava: A Critical Survey, Sambodhi, Vol. 30, 2006, pp. 32–60.
- What is Meant by Svabhavam Bhutacintakah? in Karin Preisendanz (ed.), Expanding and Merging Horizons: Contributions to South Asian and Cross Cultural Studies in Commemoration of Wilhelm Halbfass, Wien: Verlag der Österreichischen Akademie der Wissenschaften, 2007, pp. 275–81. (Vienna: Austrian Academy of Science Press).
- The Carvakas and the Jains: An Overview, JJ, Vol. 42 No. 4, April 2008a, pp. 178–83.
- Five More Carvaka Fragments (Verse), Psyche and Society, Vol. 6 No. 1, July 2008b, pp. 24–26.
- Pre-Carvaka Materialism in Vasudevahimdi, JJ, Vol. 43 No. 3, January 2009, pp. 102–09 (published in July 2010).
- Lokayata Darsana and a Comparative Study with Greek materialism, in Partha Ghose (ed.), Materialism and Immaterialism in India and the West: Varying Vistas. New Delhi: Centre for the Studies on Civilizations, 12:5, 2010c, pp. 21–34.
- Lokayata Materialism: Classification of Source Material in Subuddhi Charan Goswami (ed.). Lokayata Philosophy: A Fresh Appraisal. Kolkata: The Asiatic Society, 2010d, pp..
- Commentators on the Carvakasutra: A Critical Survey, Journal of Indian Philosophy (August 2010a), 38: 4, 419–430.
- What the Carvakas Originally Meant: More on the Commentators of the Carvakasutra, Journal of Indian Philosophy (December 2010b), 38:6, 529–542.
- The Social Outlook of the Carvaka/Lokayata: A Reconstruction, Indologica Taurinensia, Vol. 36, 2010e, 37–42. (published in 2012)
- Two Obscure Sanskrit Words Related to the Carvaka: pancagupta and kundakita (2011a), Journal of Indian Philosophy, (April 2011), 39:2, 167–71.
- Carvaka Miscellany (2011b), Tulsi Prajna (A peer reviewed Research Quarterly of Jain Visva Bharati University, Ladnun), 38: 152 (July–December 2011), 55–64.
- Svabhavavada and the Carvaka/Lokayata: A Historical Overview (2012a), Journal of Indian Philosophy, 40:5, October 2012, pp. 593–614.
- What is Meant by Svabhava: Chattopadhyaya and Needham (2012b), Psyche and Society, Vo.10 No.2, December 2012, pp. 18–20.
- Lokayata and Its Derivatives in the Sad-dharma-pundarika-sutra (2012c), Esercizi Filosofici 7, 2012, pp. 98–103.
- Development of Materialism in India: the Pre-Carvakas and the Carvakas, Esercizi Filosofici 8, 2013, pp. 1–12. (2013a). ISSN 1970-0164 Link: https://www2.units.it/eserfilo/art813/bhattacharya813.pdf
- The Base Text and its Commentaries: Problems of Representing and Understanding (2013b), Argument (Cracow), Vol.3 No.1, pp. 133–49. (2013b)
- Verses Attributed to Bṛhaspati in the Sarvadarśanasaṃgraha Chap. I: A Critical Appraisal. Journal of Indian Philosophy, 41:6, December 2013, pp. 615–30. (2013c)
- Reflections on the Jabali Episode of the Ramayana (Ayodhyakanda). Journal of Indian Philosophy, May 2015 (2015a).
- Who Are the lokayatika brahmanas? Annali di Ca’ Foscrie orientale vol.53- Giugno (June), 2017, pp. 185–204.
- “Cārvāka.” In: Oxford Bibliographies in Hinduism. Ed. Tracy Coleman. New York: Oxford University Press,2017.

=== Lectures ===
- "Cārvāka/Lokāyata Philosophy: Some Common Misrepresentations concerning the Cārvāka/Lokāyata Examined" - Lecture delivered at School of Habitat Studies, Tata Institute of Social Sciences, Mumbai, delivered on 2, 3 & 5 December 2014
- Bankimer sei Biral. Amiya Roychowdhury Memorial Lecture, Kolkata 2017.
- Bankimer Samya-bhavna. Chandan Kumar Bhattacharya Memorial Lecture, Kolkata 2018.
- Rabindranather Samajbad-bhavna. Arun Ghosh Memorial Lecture, 2018.

=== Books edited ===
- Kaler Nikashe Sibaramer Moscow banam Pondicherry, Kolkata: Pavlov Institute, 2005 (Ed. with Asish Lahiri)
- Inscribing Identity. Essays from Nineteenth Century Bengal. Kolkata: K.P.Bagchi and Co., 2009(in collaboration with Krishna Sen)
- Sangham Saranam Gachchhami Ityadi Agranthita Rachana by Debiprasad Chattopadhyaya. Kolkata: Ababhas, 2010.
- Agranthita Bitarka by Debiprasad Chattopadhyaya [and others]. Kolkata: Ababhas, 2012.(Co-edited with Malayendu Dinda)
- Yuger Par Yug by Debiprasad Chattopadhyaya. Kolkata: Ababhas, 2014.(Co-edited with Malayendu Dinda)
- Biyogpanji by Pramatha Chaudhuri. Kolkata: Sahajpath, 2014.(Co-edited with Malayendu Dinda)
- Prasanga: Vivekananda. Kolkata: Pavlov Institute, 2015 (Co-edited with Asish Lahiri)
- Science and Philosophy in Ancient India: A collection of articles by Debiprasad Chattopadhyaya. (2013), New Delhi: Aakar Books.
