= Louis Renou =

French Indologist (1896–1966)

Louis Renou (French: [ʁənu]; 26 October 1896 – 18 August 1966) was the pre-eminent French Indologist of the twentieth century.

== Education and career ==
After passing the agrégation examination in 1920, Louis Renou taught for a year at the lycée in Rouen. He then took a sabbatical, read the works of Sanskrit scholars and attended the classes of Antoine Meillet. Henceforth he opted exclusively for the study of Sanskrit. He attended the lectures of Jules Bloch at the École des hautes études. The work he did at this time gave rise to Les maîtres de la philologie védique (1928). His doctoral thesis, submitted in 1925, was La valeur du parfait dans les hymnes védiques. After a short time at the Faculté de lettres in Lyon, he moved to L'École des hautes études and then to the Sorbonne where he succeeded Alfred A. Foucher. In 1934 he co-authored Vrtra et Vrθragna: Étude de Mythologie Indo-Iranienne, with Émile Benveniste. As the text's 'Avant-Propos' says, Renou wrote the part on India, and Benveniste the part on Iran, the Introduction and Conclusion. In 1946 Renou was elected to the Académie des Inscriptions.

In the following years he undertook three journeys: India in 1948-1949, Yale University in 1953, and Tokyo in 1954-1956 where he was director of the Maison franco-japonaise. He hardly travelled after this.

He had settled on his line of study early on and never wrote about any subject other than India. He left to one side archaeology, political history and Buddhism and concentrated firmly on the tradition that, beginning with the Rig Veda, runs through all aspects of belief and practice right up to the present. For forty years he regularly published articles and books that were often voluminous, were based on original research, and are of considerable merit. The study of the Indian theory of grammar lies at the heart of his work. This can be seen in the Études védiques et paninéennes published between 1955 and 1966. The Études consist of more than two thousand pages of translation and commentary of Vedic hymns. The Études covered two thirds of the Rig Veda by the time of his death.

He, in his 1953 lectures on the religions of India, observe that "the Jaina movement presents evidence that is of great interest both for the historical and comparative study of religion in ancient India and for the history of religion in general. Based on profoundly Indian elements, it is at the same time a highly original creation, containing very ancient material, more ancient than that of Buddhism, and your highly refined and elaborated."

Louis Renou was director of the Institut de civilisation indienne and attended regularly meetings of the Académie and the Societé Asiatique. He died in 1966.

== Published work ==
In English

- Religions of Ancient India, 1968, Schocken Books, ISBN 0-8052-0179-3
- History of Vedic India. New Delhi, Sanjay Prakashan, 2004, xi, 216 p., ISBN 81-7453-102-5
- Hinduism, 1961, George Braziller, ISBN 0-8076-0164-0
- A History of Sanskrit Language (translated by Balbir, Jagbans Kishore), 2003, ISBN 81-202-0529-4

In French (selected publications only)

- Vrtra et Vrθragna: Étude de Mythologie Indo-Iranienne, with Émile Benveniste, Paris: Imprimerie Nationale, 1934.
- L’Inde classique : manuel des études indiennes, with Jean Filliozat, Paris : Payot, 1947
- L’Inde classique : manuel des études indiennes, with Jean Filliozat, vol. II (with Paul Demiéville, Olivier Lacombe and Pierre Meile), Paris : Imprimerie Nationale, 1953
- Aṣṭādhyāyī. La grammaire de Pāṇini, Paris : École française d’Extrême-Orient, 1966
- L'Inde fondamentale, Hermann, Collection Savoir, c. 1978. ISBN 2-7056-5885-8.
- Louis Renou : choix d'études indiennes (2 volumes), Paris : École française d'Extrême-Orient, 1997
- Notes sur la version « Paippalada » de l'Atharva-veda, Paris : imprimerie nationale, 1964
- Sur le genre du Sutra dans la littérature sanskrite, Paris : imprimerie nationale, 1963
- Littérature sanskrite, A. Maissonneuve, 1946
- Grammaire et Vedanta, Paris : imprimerie nationale, 1957
- Fragments du Vinaya Sanskrit, Paris : imprimerie nationale, 1911
- Études védiques, Paris : imprimerie nationale, 1952
- Études védiques et paninéennes (2 volumes), Paris: imprimerie nationale, 1980-1986
- Anthologie sanskrite, Paris : Payot, 1961
