= Walter Ruben (Indologist) =

German Indologist (1899–1982)

- Born: 26 December 1899
- Died: 7 November 1982 (aged 82)
- Occupation: Indologist

Walter Ruben (26 December 1899 – 7 November 1982) was a German Indologist. His main contribution was on the social history of ancient India and on the history of Indian philosophy and literature.

== Walter Ruben's Writings ==
=== Books ===
- 1928 Die Nyayasutra’s Leipzig.
- 1936 Studien zur Textgeschichte des Ramayana. Stuttgart
- 1939 Eisenschmiede und Dämonen…. Leiden
- 1952 Über die Literatur der vorarischen Stämme Indiens. Berlin
- 1959 Das Pancatantra und seine Morallehre. Berlin
- 1967-73 Die Gesellschaftliche Entwicklung im alten Indien, vols. 1–6. Berlin
