= Adèle de Batz de Trenquelléon =

French religious sister

Blessed Mary of the Conception de Trenquelléon, FMI

Virgin, foundress
- Born: Adèle de Batz de Trenquelléon; 10 June 1789; Feugarolles, Agenois, Kingdom of France
- Died: 10 January 1828 (aged 38); Agen, Lot-et-Garonne, Kingdom of France
- Venerated in: Catholic Church (Marianist Family)
- Beatified: 10 June 2018, Agen, Lot-et-Garonne, France, by Cardinal Angelo Amato, S.D.B. (on behalf of Pope Francis)
- Feast: 10 January

Adèle de Batz de Trenquelléon, FMI, religious name Mary of the Conception (French: Marie de la Conception), (10 June 1789 – 10 January 1828), was a religious sister and the co-founder of the Marianist Sisters with William Joseph Chaminade. The religious institute in the Roman Catholic Church was founded to serve the poor.

As a child, de Trenquelléon's desire had been to become a Carmelite, but this desire was never to materialize; she instead focused herself on serving the poor wherever and whenever she could. The congregation was founded with the intention of serving the poor and supporting the Sodalities of the Immaculate Conception that were started by William Joseph Chaminade and supported by Marie-Thérèse Charlotte de Lamourous as missionaries of Mary, thus combining certain aspects of the Carmelite charism with this impulse to balance the aspirations of the two co-founders.

The cause for her beatification was opened in the mid-1960s. On 5 June 1986, Pope John Paul II confirmed her heroic virtue and titled her as venerable. Pope Francis confirmed a miracle attributed to her intercession and approved her beatification in May 2017. Mary of the Conception de Trenquelléon was beatified in Agen on 10 June 2018, the anniversary of her birth.

== Life ==
=== Childhood and refuge ===
Trenquelléon was born on 10 June 1789, in the Château de Trenquelléon in Feugarolles to the Baron Charles de Trenquelléon (1754 – 18 June 1815) and Marie-Ursule de Peyronnencq de Saint-Chamarand (1763–1846). Her baptism was celebrated just hours after her birth in the local parish church. On her maternal side she was related to King Louis IX of France.

In 1791, during the initial stages of the French Revolution, her lieutenant father led his armed forces as part of the Prince of Condé's attempt to rescue King Louis XVI. After the attack failed, her father fled to England for refuge that November. On 26 January 1792, a son, Charles Polycarp, was born into the family. On 27 September 1797, the baroness and her children were granted permission to go into exile in Spain. The following spring, however, they (along with other French refugees) were expelled from Spain at the request of the French Revolutionary government and took refuge instead in neighboring Portugal. It was there that the baron was able to rejoin his family not long after this, in July 1798, and another daughter, Désirée, was soon born to the couple there on the following 12 June.

After the establishment of the French Consulate, France allowed its expelled refugees to return to Spain in 1800, and on 8 September of that year the family returned and settled in San Sebastián. It was there that Adele made her First Communion on 6 January 1801, the Feast of the Epiphany, in the local Church of Santa María. The following 14 November, the family finally received permission to return to their chateau in France, to which they returned the following January. On 6 February 1803 she received the sacrament of confirmation from the Bishop of Agen.

It was in San Sebastian that Adele came to know the Carmelite nuns who inspired her to consider answering a call to religious life. Not long after their return to France, Adele—by then eleven years old—told her parents of her desire to become a Carmelite nun. However, due to her young age, her mother persuaded her to wait before entering the convent. In the meantime, Adele asked her older brother's tutor, Monsieur Ducourneau, to write a "rule of life" for her in order to prepare her for life in an enclosed religious order. On 5 August 1803, she and some friends formed a spiritual union called the "Little Society", which had as its goal to create a network of women who would support each other in their faith. Her closest friend was Jeanne Diché, with whom she formed the "Little Society". As this association grew, Adele began writing to all its members from her home in the Chateau de Trenquelléon. This association grew rapidly and by 1808, its members numbered some 60 people, mostly young women from the countryside, as well as a few priests. At this time, Adele began visiting the sick and inviting poor children from the country to her home to teach them about the fundamentals of the Christian faith. By 1814, the number of members had grown to over 200.

=== Collaborating with Chaminade ===
In 1808 her mother visited a friend who worked at a hospital in Figeac. While telling this friend in the hospital waiting room about her daughter's group another man, Hyacinthe Lafon, in the waiting area overheard their conversation and told the baroness that the association's goals and purposes sounded similar to group to which he belonged, based in Bordeaux, that Chaminade had founded. Lafon suggested that her daughter and Chaminade begin corresponding. The baroness brought the group to her daughter's attention and she and Chaminade begin corresponding at once. He soon sent some information about his group to her and circa 1809 the association had re-shaped itself in accordance with the organization and spirit of Chaminade's movement.

With the return to power of Napoleon in 1809, the government authorities resumed the policy of suppression of religious organizations and detained Chaminade. Trenquelléon saved their good work though her quick thinking and social position and saw her association able to continue its goals. In November 1808 she chose to reject an offer of marriage that had been made to her, which later turned into a choice to renounce marriage forever. Despite suffering from a severe illness in 1810 she resumed her work of care for the sick and the education of the poor, as well as her correspondence with the members of the association. But soon she began to dream about founding a religious congregation composed of some of the women of the association that would be engaged in the care of the poor. Chaminade saw a parallel to developments in his own foundations and invited her to join him. However she would have to wait to fulfill her dream for she had to nurse her father through a critical illness, not to mention of the persisting government restrictions on religious organizations nationwide.

The fall of Bonaparte in 1814 saw the birth of a new freedom from the restrictions imposed on religious organizations during his rule. Trenquelléon saw that the chance had come to realize her dream and sought the required permissions – both civil and ecclesiastical – to establish the women of the new congregation as such and based in her castle. She sought Chaminade's guidance and support in this and what he proposed to her was that the congregation she envisioned take on the character of a missionary movement. Soon after, she and her companions made private religious vows to remain celibate and began to wear a silver ring as an indication of this fact, doing so in the privacy of the confessional at the insistence of Jacoupy.

The canonical establishment of the new congregation was put off due to Chaminade's desire for the group to develop its sense of its mission and path. But Napoleon's return to power in March 1815 suspended all moves and soon after Chaminade was arrested and transferred to central France where he was forbidden to have contact with the various religious groups that he was leading. But that fall Napoleon been removed from power and Chaminade was freed. The death of the Baron and the change in civil law left her free to embark on her desired path while Chaminade saw the time as being opportune and authorized her to rent part of an ancient convent in the local capital of Agen. This was done in 1816 at which point she renounced her inheritance in favor of her brother on that 17 April. Her final farewell to her mother and siblings was on 24 May 1816.

=== Foundress ===
In 1816 the members of her group and Chaminade's group's female members formed a religious congregation known as the Daughters of Mary Immaculate, better known as the Marianist Sisters, which sought to combine an impulse for mission work with the contemplative nature of the Carmelite Order which she had once aspired to join. The local bishop had suspended permission for the women to take religious vows over the issue of the enclosure which was required with this step; the women were allowed to wear a religious habit during the Octave of Christmas alone and at no other stage until such permission could be granted on a formal level. On 25 July 1817 the local bishop permitted the women to take their vows – albeit in private – in the confessional so as to keep it a secret. Chaminade accepted their vows on an individual level in this manner. In 1824 the French government authorized the existence of this religious congregations. The religious also corresponded on a frequent basis with her close friend Émilie de Rodat since 21 June 1819. On 7 October 1820 she admitted her cousin Elizabeth de Casteras to the novitiate.

=== Illness and death ===
In 1825 she had become so ill that Chaminade had to plead with her to restrict her service. Nevertheless, she continued her correspondence with the sisters though more so with the local superiors and the novices. In 1826 she suffered stomach problems and her health worsened. On 29 January 1827 her situation was said to have worsened even more. On 27 October 1827 she composed her last will. The nun spent her final months working for the legal recognition of the congregation. At 38 years old, De Trenquelléon died of tuberculosis in Agen in 1828 and was buried at the convent; her final words were: "Hosanna to the Son of David!"

== Beatification process ==
The beatification process opened in an informative process that spanned from 5 February 1965 until its closure on 21 March 1966 and this process was conducted in the Diocese of Agen; her spiritual writings and letters received theological approval on 10 July 1970 before the positio dossier was submitted to the Congregation for the Causes of Saints in 1974. The historical commission first assessed and approved the dossier on 5 November 1975 prior to the approval of the Congregation's members and their consultants on 5 May 1977. The formal introduction to the cause came under Pope Paul VI on 12 November 1976 in which her conferred title of Servant of God was legitimized. The Congregation approved this cause on 11 June 1977. Theologians approved the cause on 28 January 1986 while the Congregation re-examined the cause on 22 April 1986. De Trenquelléon was named as venerable on 5 June 1986 after Pope John Paul II confirmed that she had lived a model life of heroic virtue.

A miraculous healing attributed to De Trenquelléon's intercession was investigated in the Italian diocese of Novara from November 2013 until 12 June 2014. Medical experts examined and approved this miracle on 12 May 2016 as well as theologians on 19 January 2017 and the Congregaion on 2 May 2017. On 4 May 2017, Pope Francis signed a decree that confirmed the healing was a miracle and thus approved de Trenquelléon's beatification. It took place on 10 June 2018 in Agen, celebrated by Cardinal Angelo Amato, SDB. The postulator for the cause is Antonio Gascón Aranda, SM

== Legacy ==
De Trenquelléon is the namesake of the Adèle Center at the University of Dayton, a Catholic Marianist institution in Ohio. The center houses Campus Ministry resources and worship spaces. The university dedicated the building to her in recognition of her role in founding the Marianist Sisters and her work in religious education.
