= Marianist Sisters =

Catholic religious institute

The Daughters of Mary Immaculate (French: Filles de Marie Immaculée, abbreviated F.M.I.) are a Catholic religious institute of Religious Sisters co-founded in 1816 by Adèle de Batz de Trenquelléon and William Joseph Chaminade for the purpose of providing assistance to the poor. They are commonly known as the Marianist Sisters.

== History ==
=== Foundations ===
Born into a noble family in 1789, Trenquelléon and her family had to flee France due to the French Revolution. While living in exile in Spain, she came to know the Carmelite nuns, who then inspired her to consider answering a call to a religious way of life. She felt drawn to their contemplative way of life as an enclosed religious order.

In January 1802, not long after their return to France, Trenquelléon—by then eleven years old—told her parents of her desire to become a Carmelite nun. However, due to her young age, her mother persuaded her to wait before entering the monastery. In the meantime, Adele asked her older brother's tutor, a priest named Ducourneau, to write a Rule of Life for her in order to prepare her for life as a contemplative. On August 5, 1803, she and some friends formed a spiritual union called the "Little Society," which had as its goal to create a network of young women who would support each other in their faith. Her closest friend was Jeanne Diché, with whom she formed the Association. As this circle grew, Adele began writing to all its members from her home in the Chateau de Tranquelleon. The following year she drew up a Rule of Life for the Association. This association grew rapidly and by 1808, its members numbered some 60 people, mostly young women from the countryside, as well as some older women and a few priests, who were accepted as affiliated members. At this time, Adele began visiting the sick and inviting poor children from the country to her home to teach them about the fundamentals of the Catholic faith. By 1814, the number of members had grown to over 200.

=== Collaborating with Chaminade ===
In 1808 Trenquelléon's mother visited a friend who worked at a hospital in Figeac. While telling this friend in the hospital waiting room about her daughter's group, another man in the waiting area, Hyacinthe Lafon, overheard their conversation and told the baroness that the association's goals and purposes sounded similar to a sodality to which he belonged based in Bordeaux which Chaminade had founded. Lafon suggested that her daughter and Chaminade should get in touch with one another. The baroness bought the group to her daughter's attention and she and Chaminade begin corresponding at once. He soon sent some information about his group to her and c. 1809 the association had re-shaped itself in accordance with the organization and spirit of Chaminade's movement.

With the return to power of Napoleon Bonaparte in 1809, the government authorities resumed the policy of suppression of religious organizations and detained Chaminade. Trenquelléon saved their good work though her quick thinking and social position and saw her association able to continue its goals. In November 1808 she chose to reject an offer of marriage that had been made to her, which later turned into a choice to renounce marriage forever. Despite suffering from a severe illness in 1810 she resumed her work of care for the sick and the education of the poor, as well as her correspondence with the members of the association. But soon she began to dream about founding a religious order composed of some of the women of the association who would be engaged in the care of the poor. Chaminade saw a parallel to developments in his own foundations and invited her to join him. However she would have to wait to fulfill her dream for she had to nurse her father through a critical illness, not to mention the persisting government restrictions on religious organizations nationwide.

The fall of Bonaparte in 1814 saw the birth of a new freedom from the restrictions imposed on religious organizations during his rule. Trenquelléon saw that the chance had come to realize her dream and sought the required permissions – both civil and ecclesiastical – to establish the women of her new order as such and based in her castle. She sought Chaminade's guidance and support in this and what he proposed to her was that the order she envisioned take on the character of a missionary movement. After discussion among the members, the group agreed, and soon after, she and her companions made private religious vows to remain celibate and began to wear a silver ring as an indication of this fact, doing so in the privacy of the confessional at the insistence of the local bishop, Jean Jacoupy.

The canonical establishment of the new congregation was put off due to Chaminade's desire for the group to develop its sense of its mission and path. But Napoleon's return to power in March 1815 suspended all moves and soon after Chaminade was arrested and transferred to central France where he was forbidden to have contact with the various religious groups that he was leading. But by that Fall Napoleon been removed from power and Chaminade was freed. The death of the baron in June of that year and the change in civil law left Trenquelléon free to embark on her desired path, while Chaminade saw the time as being opportune and authorized her to rent part of an ancient monastery formerly occupied by members of the Augustinian Order in the local capital of Agen. This was done in 1816, at which point she renounced her inheritance in favor of her brother on that 17 April.

=== Founding ===
On May 25, 1816, Trenquelléon moved into the former monastery in Agen expecting to form a religious congregation to be known as the Daughters of Mary, which sought to combine an impulse for mission work with the contemplative prayer life of the Carmelite nuns whom she had once aspired to join. By June, members of Trenquelléon's Association and the female members of Chaminade's sodality had joined her. Jacoupy, however, withdrew his permission for the women to take religious vows over the issue of their living within an enclosure, which would have been required by their Constitutions with this step. Nonetheless, he named a local priest, the Abbé Mouran, as formal superior of the new community, while Chaminade names Trenquelléon as the superior of the convent.

In September of that year, Chaminade made a comprise proposal of the cloister being the object of a special vow, from which a Sister could be excused by the superior. In November, Chaminade authorized the women to open a school, their first. The bishop allowed them to wear a religious habit for the feast of Christmas, which was first extended through the Octave (liturgy) of Christmas and then indefinitely through the efforts of Mouran. On 25 July 1817 the local bishop permitted the women to take their vows – albeit in private – in the confessional so as to keep it a secret. Chaminade accepted their vows on an individual level in this manner.

In 1820, the community has grown to the point where a new house could be supported. Property in Tonneins, Lot-et-Garonne, was purchased, and the new community was installed there on September 7 by Chaminade and Tranquelléon, under the leadership of Mother Thérèse Yannasch. In October of that year, Trenquelléon admitted her cousin, Elizabeth de Casteras, to the novitiate, who would become her second successor as Superior General of the congregation. Two new communities of the congregation were established in 1824. On August 20 of the year, Jacoupy gave formal approval of the congregation. The following year, the French government authorized the existence of religious congregations.

Trenquelléon continued to corresponded on a frequent basis with her close friend since 1819, Émilie de Rodat, who had founded the Sisters of the Holy Family of Villefranche in 1815. A proposal for the merger of the two communities had been made early in the foundation and was agreed upon in principle in 1822 by the leadership of both institutes, but it was rejected by the Sisters of Villefranche. The Daughters of Mary continued to expand over the coming years, despite the ill health and death, in January 1828, of their foundress and leader.

=== Development ===
Expansion of the congregation continued. By the 1860s, there were fourteen houses of the Daughters of Mary. During these years, the Superior General of the Society of Mary (or Marianist Fathers), successor to Chaminade, continued to be considered as the Ecclesiastical Superior of the Daughters of Mary, in keeping with the Constitutions of their congregation. In 1862, the then-Superior General, Father Caillet, determined to seek the formal approval of the Holy See of both branches of the Institute of Mary, as the overall movement was known. To prepare for this step, he called upon the Sisters for suggestions on a revision of their Constitutions, to be in keeping with more recent legislation by the Vatican regarding religious congregations, as well as examining issues arising from the lived experience of their foundational documents. These proposals would then be judged by a General Chapter of the congregation.

To Caillet's apparent surprise, a number of revisions were proposed by the Sisters, both major and minor, the most important being regarding the matter of the enclosure they practiced in their convents. Tension arose from his refusal to recognize some of these proposed changes. The Mother General bypassed his objections by seeking that the presidency of the upcoming Chapter be held by the Bishop of Agen, which was in keeping with their Constitutions. Caillet felt his authority as Ecclesiastical Superior of the Daughters challenged and sought the support of that same bishop in his role of Superior of the Sisters. While the bishop, through either oversight or neglect, affirmed this, the matter became a point of tension between the two Superiors General. This was made more clear in that he chose not to attend the General Chapter, held during September 1866.

As a result of the Chapter, two noticeable changes were made: 1) the Daughters ended their canonical obedience to the Superior General of the Society of Mary, now being made subject to the local bishop; 2: the vow of enclosure was ended, the practice being encouraged but made part of the vow of obedience.

== Current status ==
Today the Marianist Sisters live and serve in 16 countries throughout the world: Argentina, Brazil, Chile, Colombia, Ecuador, France, India, Italy, Ivory Coast, Japan, Malawi, Spain, South Korea, Togo, the United States, and Vietnam. In the United States, the Marianist Sisters are concentrated in Dayton, Ohio, and San Antonio, Texas.
