= Marianism =

Marianism may refer to:

- Marian devotions, to Mary the mother of Jesus
  - Veneration of Mary in the Catholic Church
- Marianist Family, a group of Catholic organizations
- Marianismo, sociological term for a Latin American ideal of femininity modelled on Our Lady of Guadalupe
