= Jakob Gapp =

Austrian priest (1897–1943)

Blessed Jakob Gapp SM

Martyr
- Born: 26 July 1897; Wattens, Tyrol, Austria-Hungary
- Died: 13 August 1943 (aged 46); Plötzensee Prison, Berlin, Nazi Germany
- Cause of death: Execution by guillotine
- Venerated in: Roman Catholic Church
- Beatified: 24 November 1996, Saint Peter's Square by Pope John Paul II
- Feast: 13 August

Jakob Gapp (26 July 1897 – 13 August 1943) was an Austrian Roman Catholic priest and a professed member from the Marianists. Gapp first served as a soldier on the Italian front during World War I at a point in his life where his religious convictions were not of high importance, though his return home from a prisoner of war camp saw him develop socialist views that soon brought him into contact with the Marianists whom he later joined. After studies and ordination, he was assigned in Austria as a teacher, where he became noted for his vehement opposition to the Nazi regime; he deemed Nazism as being some warped political tool to create division which was also incompatible with the faith.

His bold activism against the Nazi regime saw him flee when it was clear his life was endangered, along with his colleagues, and he settled in both France and Spain before returning to France after being duped into accepting two Jewish people who fled from Berlin. These two men were instead the Gestapo who arrested him and transferred him to Berlin where he was imprisoned and sentenced to death. His interrogation transcripts reveal how he deemed Nazism and Roman Catholicism to be incompatible, and his strong adherence to his faith prompted Heinrich Himmler and others to refuse the return of his remains for it would result in veneration and silent rebellion.

The beatification process for the late priest culminated after Pope John Paul II beatified him on 24 November 1996 in Saint Peter's Square.

== Life ==
Jakob Gapp was born on 26 July 1897 in Wattens as the seventh child to Martin Gapp and Antonia Wach; he received his baptism on 27 July in the local parish church of Saint Lawrence. His niece was Marianne Oberauer. He received a basic education in his hometown and in 1910 entered the high school that the Order of Friars Minor ran at Hall.

He served as a soldier on the Italian front from May 1915 until 1916 when he was wounded during a battle; he received the Silver Medal of Courage Second Class as a result of his actions on the battlefield. On 4 November 1918 he became a prisoner of war in Riva del Garda and was later released from his internment on 18 August 1919, but became a prisoner of war due to a miscommunication on the ceasefire agreement that was to commence 5 November but never did. Gapp later entered the Marianists at Greisinghof on 13 August 1920 for a formation program and began his novitiate on 26 September before being assigned to Graz as a teacher and sacristan from 1921 until 1925. He joined that order after learning about them from a relative. He made his profession in Antony in France on 27 August 1925. He began his studies for the priesthood in September 1925 at Fribourg in Switzerland and was ordained a priest by Bishop Marius Besson at the Saint Nicholas Cathedral in Fribourg on 5 April 1930.

The new priest served as a teacher and chaplain at several Marianist schools until 1938. He often gave up his own heating coal to the poor and collected food and other necessities for them. He preached against the errors of Nazism and how it was incompatible with fundamental Christian ethics; he called it "irreconcilable with the Catholic faith". Gapp was forced to flee Graz in March 1938 when German troops entered into Austria. Gapp's superiors sent him to Tyrol in September 1938 and served as an assistant pastor at Breitenwang-Reutte until October 1938 when the Gestapo ordered him not to teach religion. He refused to wear a swastika badge and to greet people with the "Heil Hitler" out of conscience, and once in public rebuked a fellow teacher who told students to "hate and kill Czechs and Jews".

Gapp also taught his students that love for all people irrespective of race or religion was crucial and taught that people ought to be worshipping God and not Adolf Hitler; this got him suspended. On 11 December 1938 he gave a sermon in which he defended Pope Pius XI from Nazi smears and directed the faithful to read Christian literature and not that which the Nazis propagated; one such document he directed others to and spoke about was Mit brennender Sorge that Pius XI issued in 1937. In January 1939 he was advised to flee Austria, and travelled to Bordeaux in France where he worked as both a chaplain and librarian. In May 1939 he headed for Spain and served at Marianist communities in Valencia as well as Cádiz and San Sebastian. While in Valencia in 1942 he went to the British consulate hoping to gain a visa to go to England but this attempt failed. He settled for reading British newspapers like The Tablet in order to find uncensored news that would tell him the truth about World War II, and he learned of the Holocaust genocide.

But Gapp was never free from the Nazis. The Gestapo followed his movements and in 1942 devised a plot to draw Gapp out from Spain into their arms along the French border. He received word of two Jewish males who fled from Berlin and were at the French border desiring his assistance after learning of him. Gapp further learned these two were brothers who wanted baptism, and so he left Spain to retrieve them. The three went on a picnic close to the border where he found that the two were not Jews but disguised Nazis who abducted him and arrested him in Hendaye on 9 November 1942; he was then sent to Berlin for incarceration. It was decided that he would not be sent to the Dachau concentration camp because Gapp was seen to be dangerous to the extent where he needed special surveillance. His resolve while being interrogated prompted Heinrich Himmler to review all interrogation transcripts and even comment on his steadfast dedication to Catholicism. Himmler said if the Nazis had one Gapp dedicated to the cause as the priest was to the faith the Nazis would have won the war at that stage. On 2 July 1943 he was condemned to death for speaking out against the Third Reich in a two-hour court session and was remanded pending his formal execution – the judgment was condemning: "He will forever be without honor". The burial of his remains was also denied during those proceedings for the Nazis feared that he would be venerated and his grave site would become the site of rebellion and silent demonstration.

In the afternoon on 13 August 1943 at 1:00 pm he was advised that he would be executed that evening, so in preparation he wrote two farewell letters. He was beheaded at 7:08 pm and his remains were used for research at the Anatomical-Biological Institute at the Berlin college. In 1996 the death sentence against him was lifted in a Berlin court on a posthumous level. His surviving remains were moved to Innsbruck in 2002.

== Beatification ==
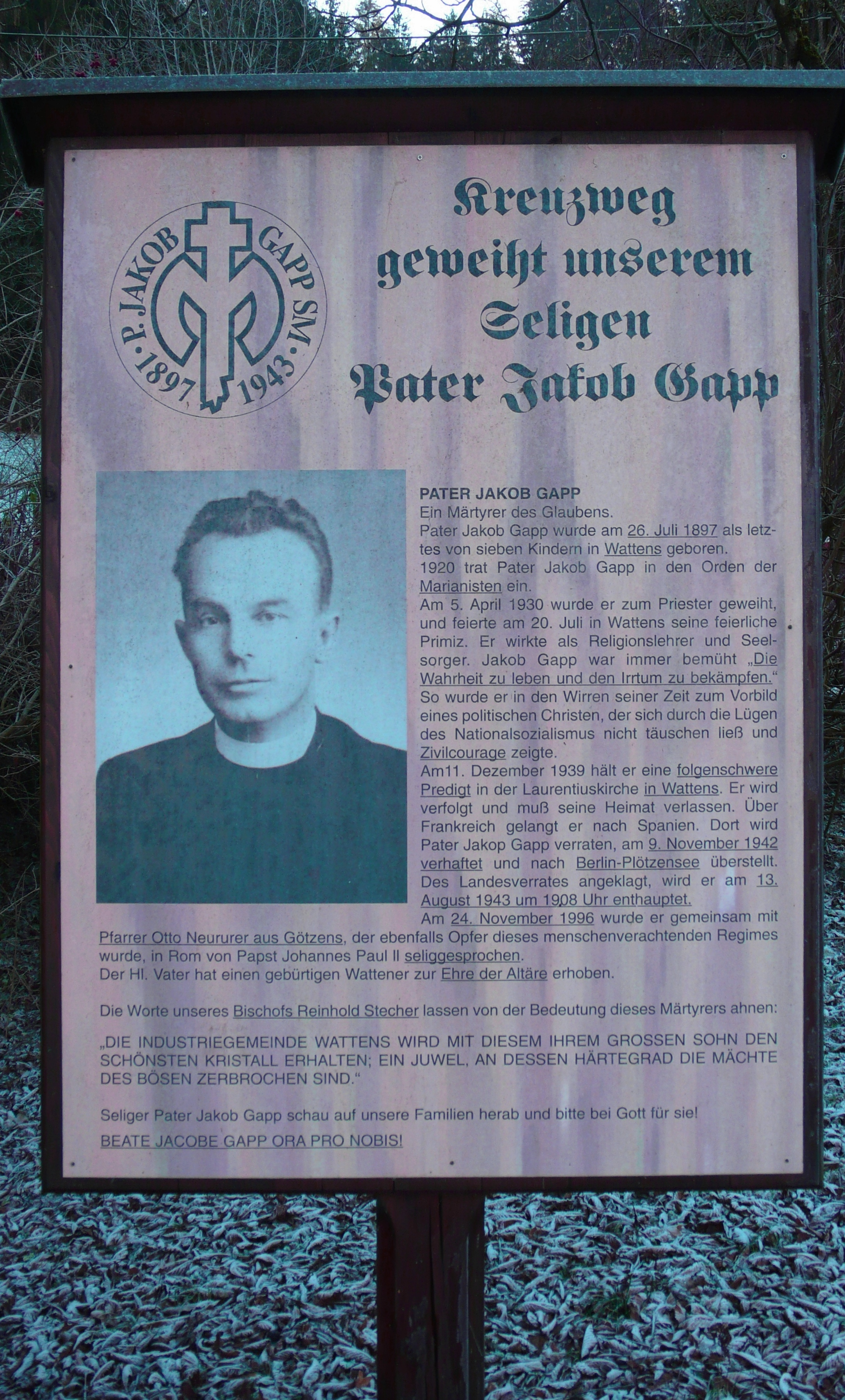
Memorial plaque in his birthplace of Wattens.

The beatification process opened in Vienna in a diocesan process under Cardinal Hans Hermann Groër on 26 June 1987 and concluded on 20 October 1987, when Gapp was titled as a Servant of God; a total of 37 witnesses were interviewed including Gapp's niece Marianne. The Congregation for the Causes of Saints validated this process on 7 April 1989 and later received the Positio from the postulation in 1992 for assessment. Theologians issued their approval to the cause on 31 January 1995 while the bishop and cardinal members of the C.C.S. approved the cause too on 4 April 1995.

His cause received approval from Pope John Paul II on 6 April 1995 after the pope determined that the late Marianist priest was killed "in odium fidei" or "in hatred of the faith". John Paul II beatified Gapp in Saint Peter's Square on 24 November 1996.

The current postulator for this cause is the Marianist priest Antonio Gascón Aranda.

== Quotations ==
Among the range of things Gapp has said in his sermons or in other forms:

- "Shepherds must remain with their people when danger threatens" – 19 October 1938.
- "Friendship with God is always the most important thing" – 15 March 1939.
- "If I did not have faith, I would not be able to guarantee my life" – 17 April 1941.
- "Everything passes; only Heaven remains" – 13 August 1943.

== Bibliography ==
- Marianist Family Authors Team (2024). Everything passes, only heavens remains. Writings of the martyr Jakob Gapp, sm. Madrid: PPC. ISBN 9788428841597.
