= Daughters of Mary Immaculate =

Daughters of Mary Immaculate may refer to:

- Daughters of Mary Immaculate (Chaldean), a Chaldean Catholic apostolic order in Iraq
- Marianist Sisters, also known as the Daughters of Mary Immaculate, a Catholic religious institute in France
- Ursuline Sisters Daughters of Mary Immaculate, a Catholic congregation of sisters in Italy
