= Gustave Strauven =

Belgian architect

Gustave Strauven (23 June 1878 – 19 March 1919) was a Belgian architect of the Art Nouveau style. He created more than 30 buildings, using new technologies and incorporating wrought iron floral motifs.

== Biography ==
Gustave Strauven was born in Schaerbeek, Brussels, on 23 June 1878, the son of Arnold Strauven, a gardener from Limburg, Belgium, and Catherine Backaert. He began his career when he was 18 years old, as an assistant designer working with Victor Horta, helping him with the Hôtel van Eetvelde and the Maison du Peuple/Volkshuis in Brussels. Two years later, he spent one year in Zurich as a draftsman in an architectural office. He then returned to Brussels, where he became a prominent architect in the Art Nouveau movement.

Mobilised during World War I, Strauven died of his injuries on 19 March 1919 in a hospital in Haute-Savoie, France. He was only forty years old. All his work was completed in less than twenty years.

== Saint-Cyr House ==
The Saint-Cyr House is Strauven's most important building, built between 1901 and 1903 in a flamboyant Art Nouveau style. It was built to serve as a private residence for the painter and decorator George Léonard de Saint-Cyr. The house is situated at 11, square Ambiorix/Ambiorixsquare in the Squares Quarter (eastern part of the City of Brussels). It is only 4 metres (13 ft) wide, but was given extraordinary height through Strauven's elaborate architectural inventions.

The façade is entirely covered by polychrome bricks and has a large amount of wrought iron, which is adorned with geometric motifs and ornate balustrades at each floor. The wrought iron mimics vegetation and the decorative elements occupy all the space available. Due to its extravagance, the building has been called Art Nouveau-Baroque. The interior is characterised by different styles, varying according to the rooms.

The house had been in a poor state of repair, but as of March 2013, has been restored to its former splendour by the architect Francis Metzger, from the architectural office MA² - Metzger et Associés Architecture.

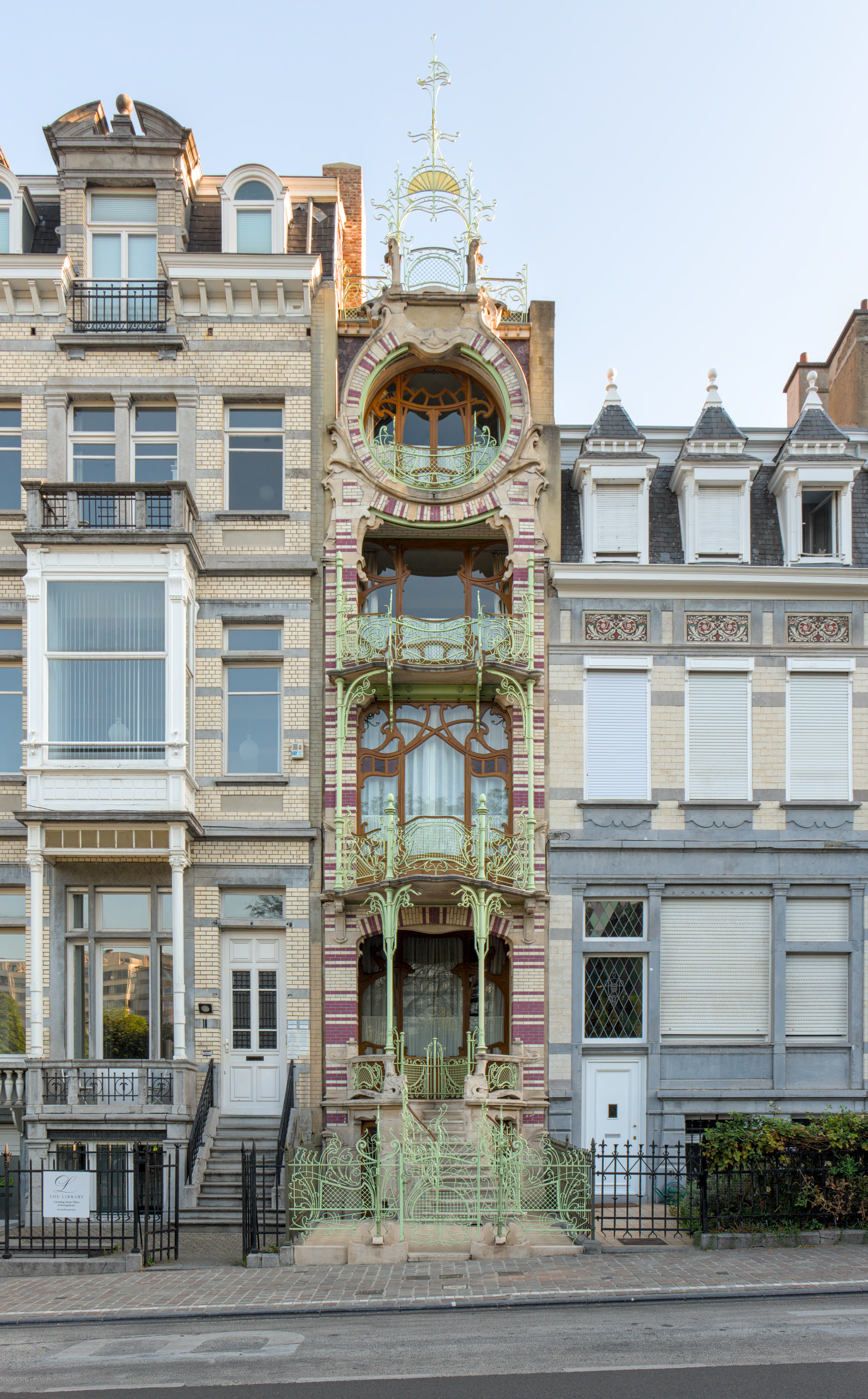
Saint-Cyr House

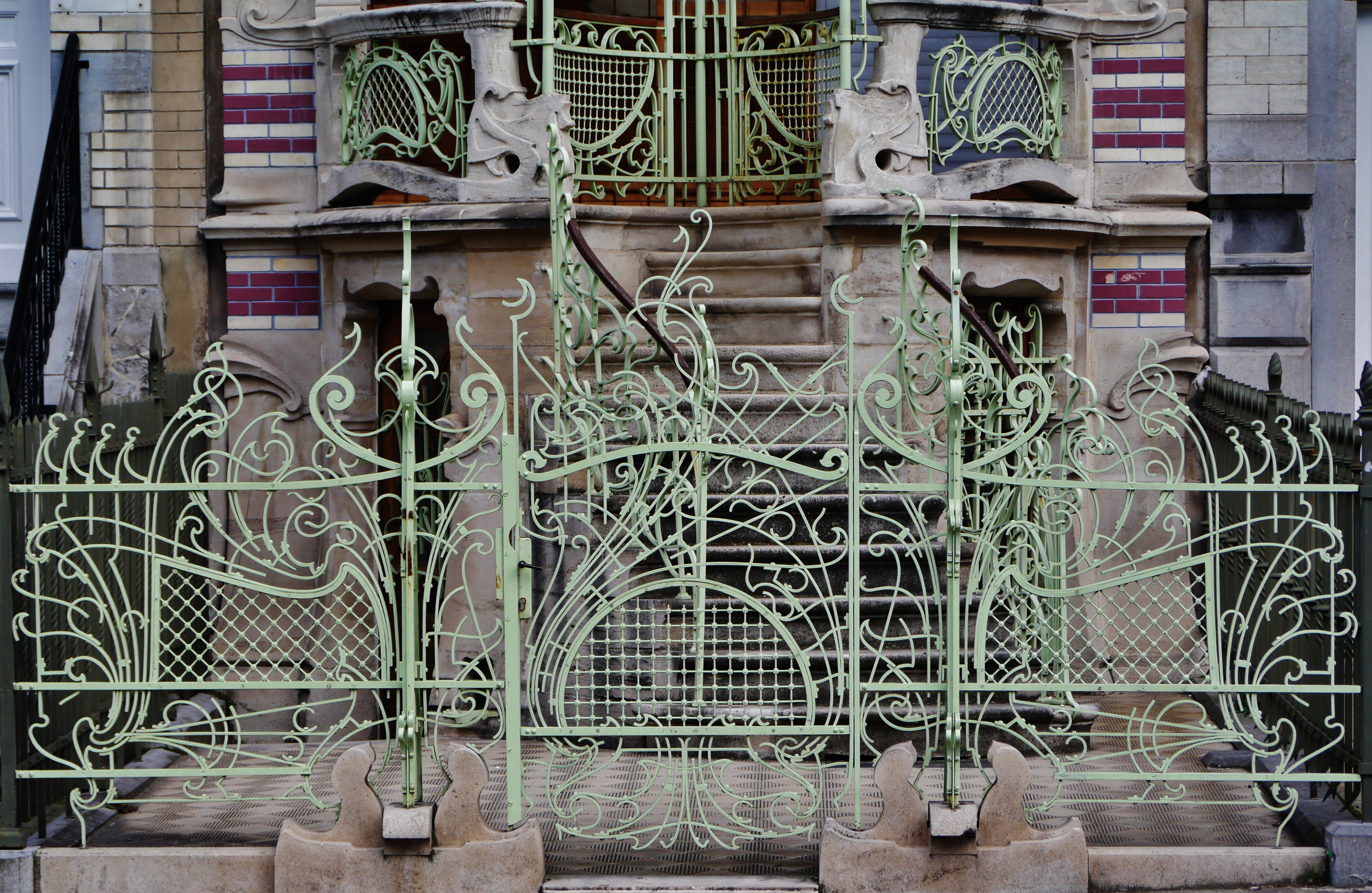
Entrance fence

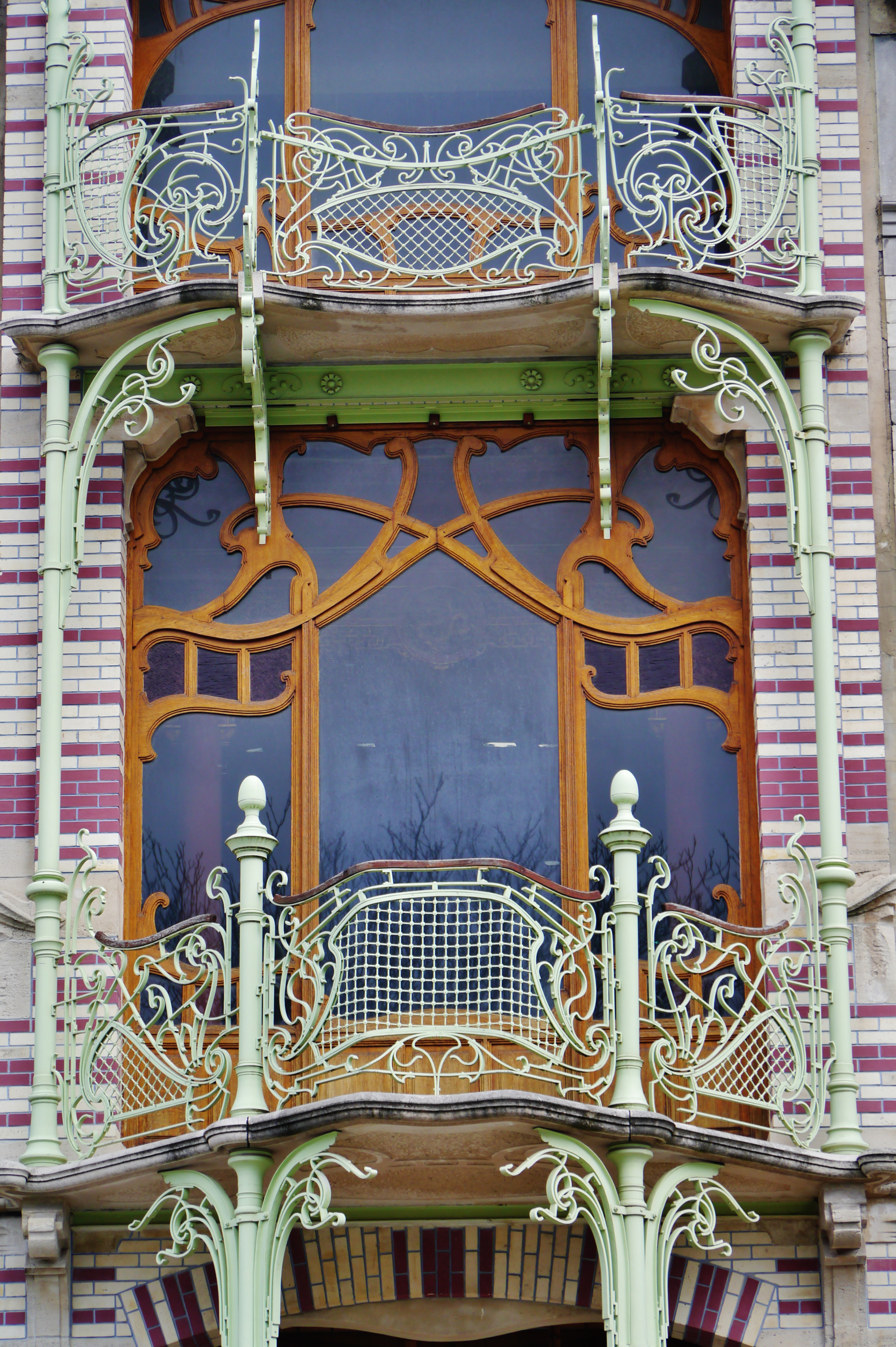
Wrought iron balconies

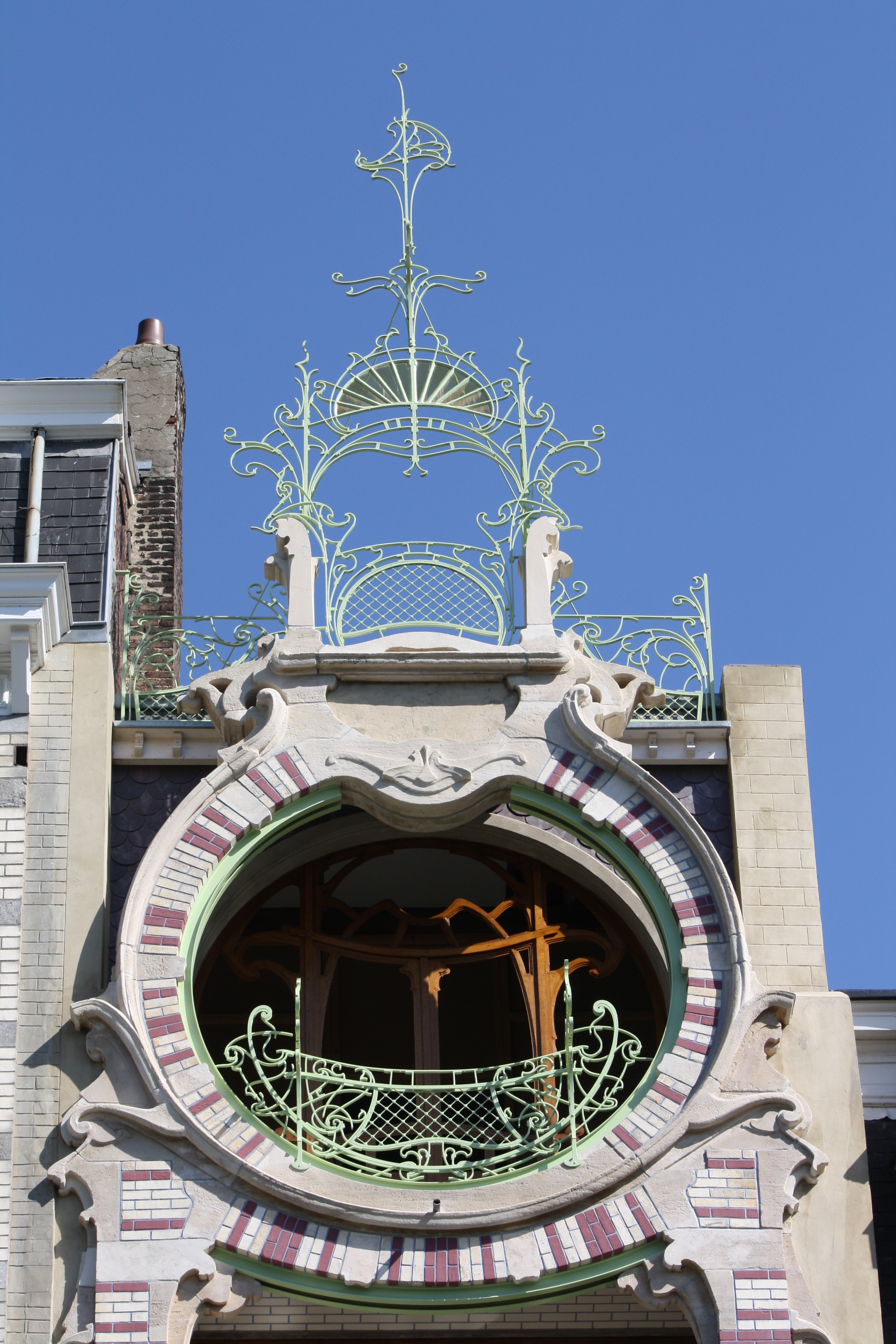
Gable

== More works ==
- Houses of Mme Spaak, rue Saint-Quentin/Sint-Quintensstraat, 30–32, Squares Quarter, Brussels (1899)
- Van Dijck House, boulevard Clovis/Clovislaan, 85, Squares Quarter, Brussels (1899–1901)
- Private house, rue Van Campenhout/Van Campenhoutstraat, 51, Squares Quarter, Brussels (1901)
- De Beck building, avenue Paul de Jaer/Paul de Jaerlaan, 9, Saint-Gilles (1902)
- Private house, rue Souveraine/Opperstraat, 52, Ixelles (1902)
- Strauven House, rue Luther/Lutherstraat, 28, Squares Quarter, Brussels (1902)
- Van den Heede House, rue de l'Abdication/Troonsafstandsstraat, 4, Squares Quarter, Brussels (1904)
- Apartment and shop building, avenue Louis Bertrand/Louis Bertrandlaan, 55–65 and rue Josaphat/Josaphatstraat, 338–340, Schaerbeek (1906)
- Private house, Chaussée de Wavre/Waversesteenweg, Etterbeek
- Private house, avenue des Volontaires, 2, Tournai
- Private house, avenue Van Cutsem, 29, Tournai
- Apartment building, rue Rasson/Rassonstraat, 43–45, Schaerbeek (1906, attributed to Strauven on the basis of strong analogy with his other works)
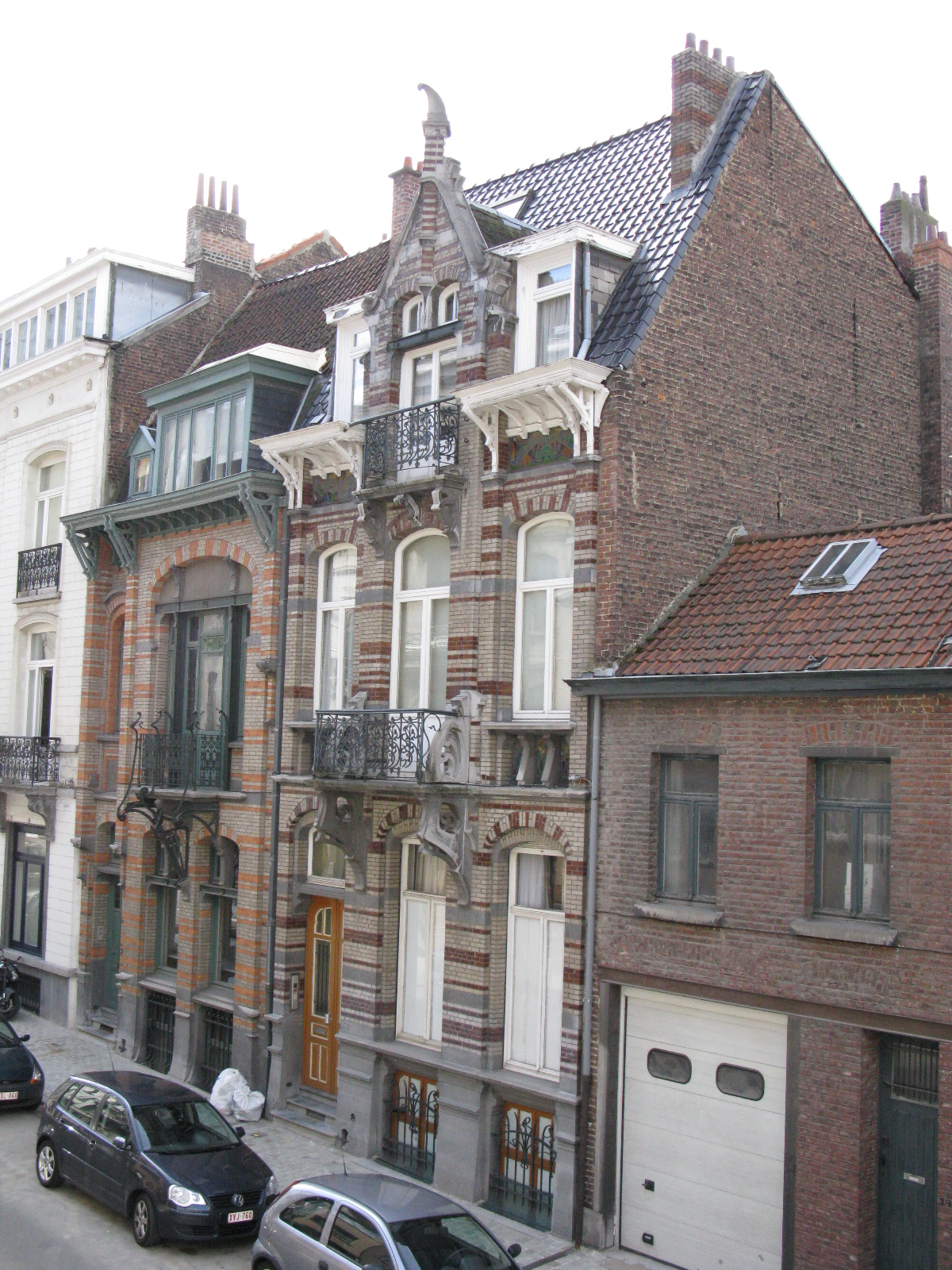
Houses of Mme Spaak, rue Saint-Quentin/Sint-Quintensstraat 30–32, Brussels (1899)

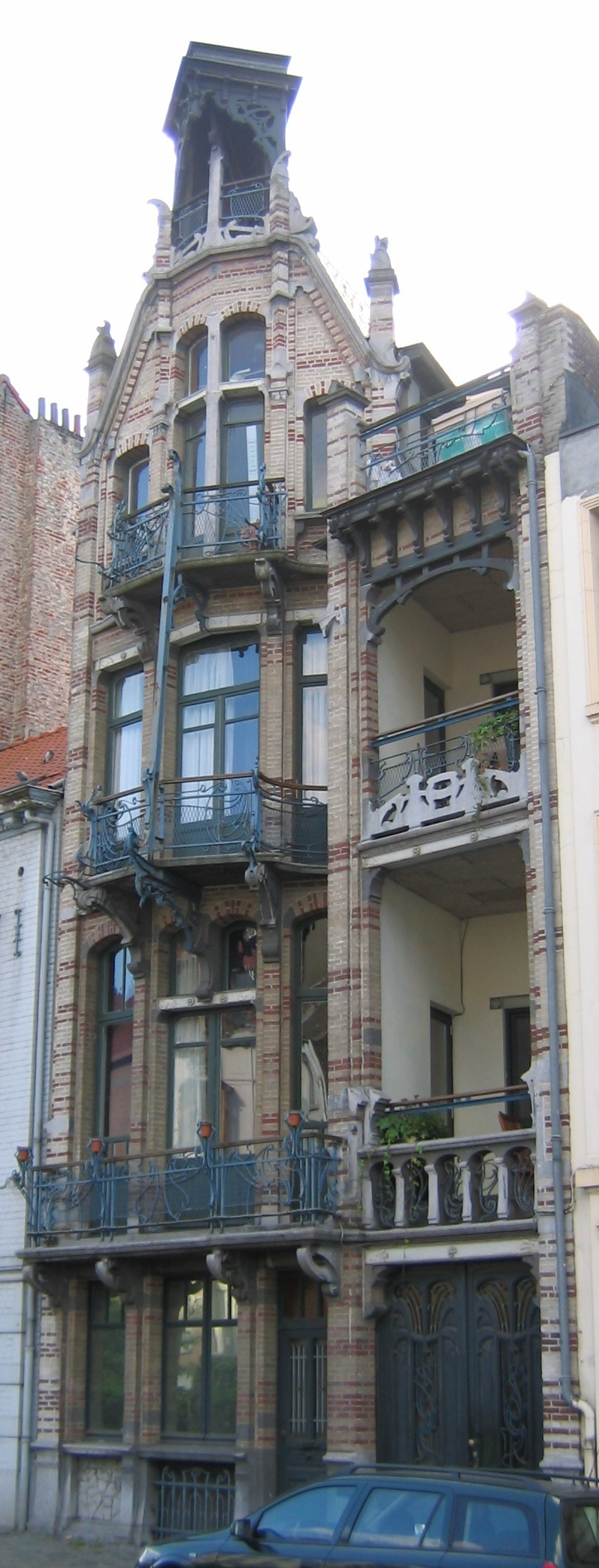
Van Dijck House, boulevard Clovis/Clovislaan 85, Brussels (1899–1901)

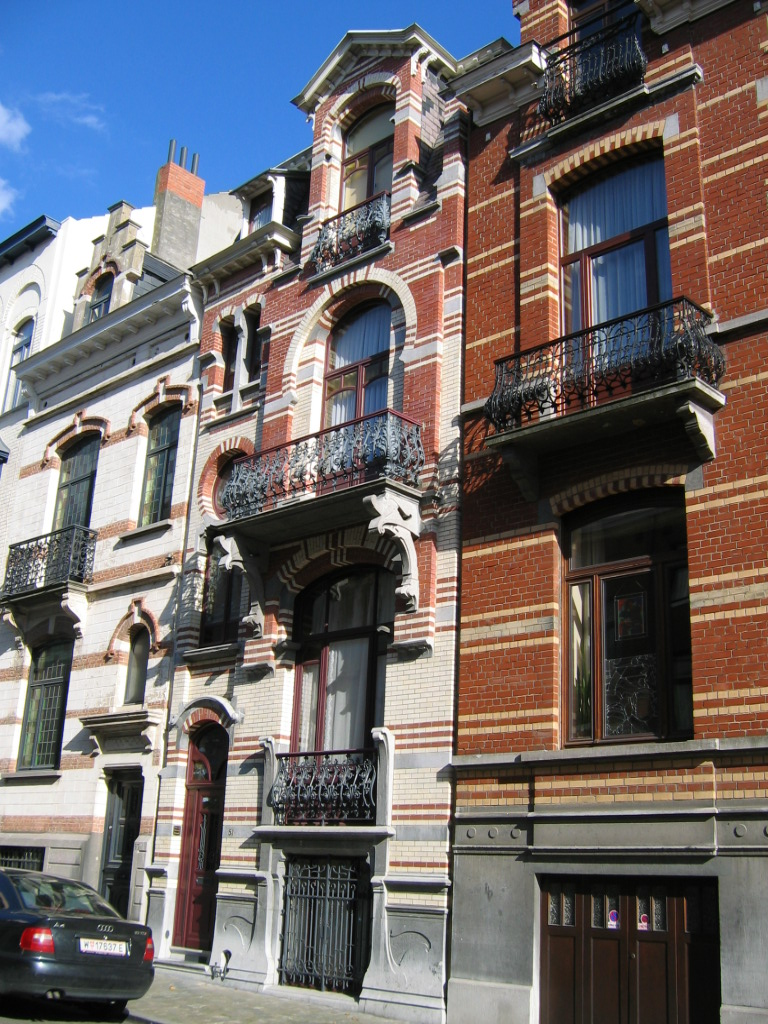
Private house, rue Van Campenhout/rue Van Campenhoutstraat 51, Brussels (1901)

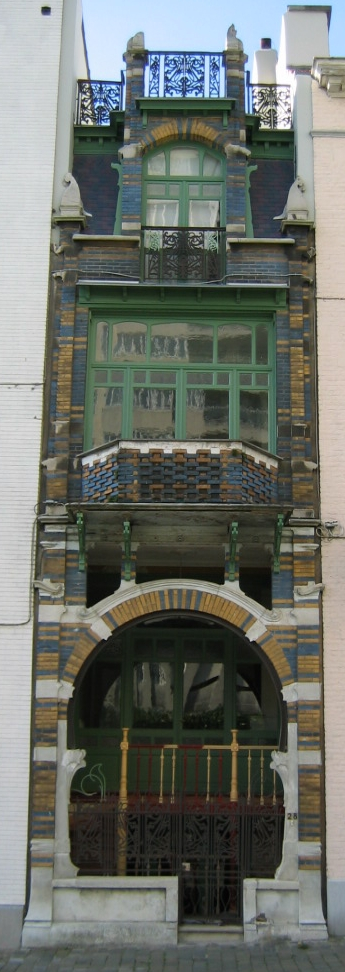
Strauven House, rue Luther/Lutherstraat 28, Brussels (1902)

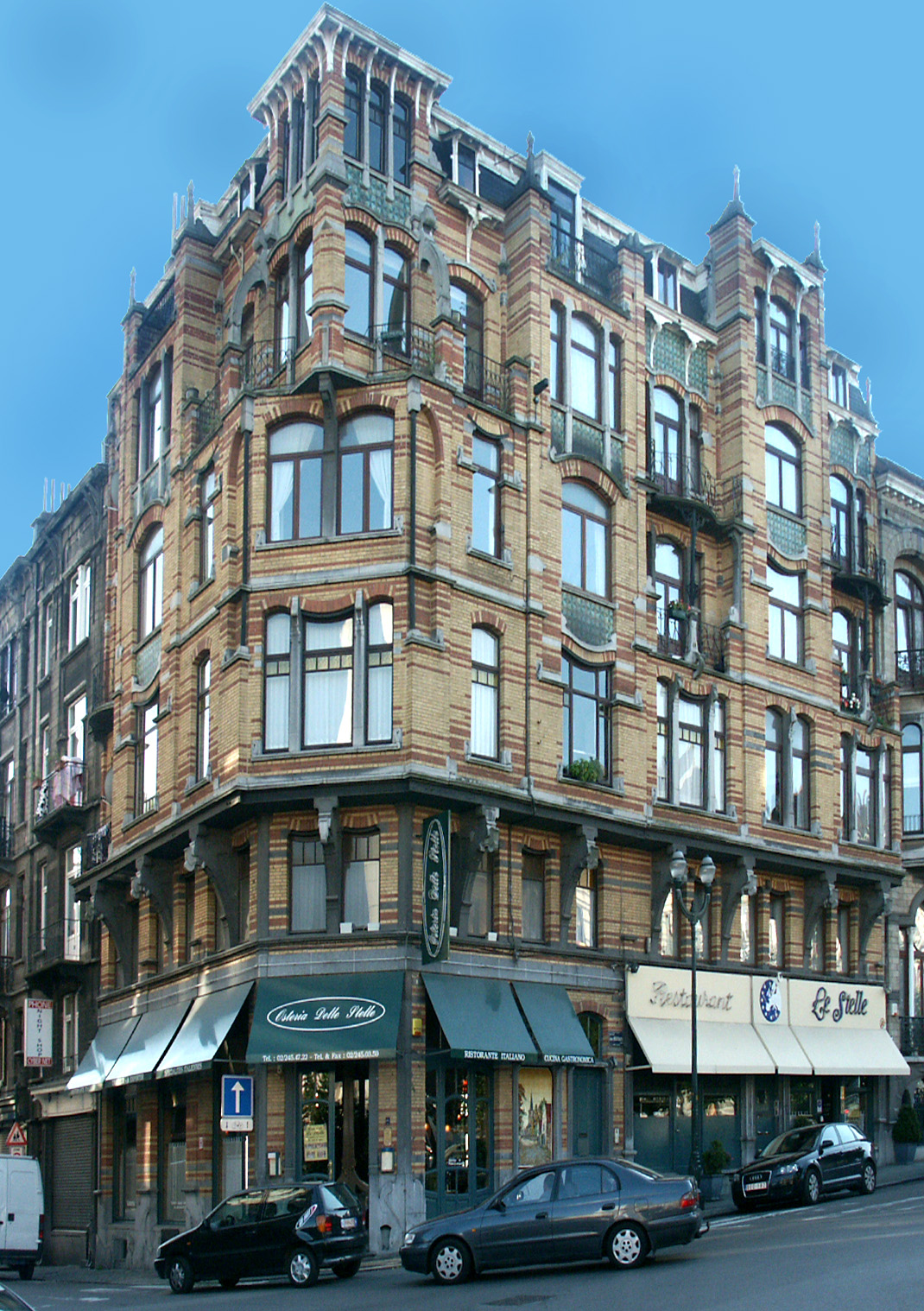
Apartment and shop building, avenue Louis Bertrand/Louis Bertrandlaan 55–65, Schaerbeek (1906)

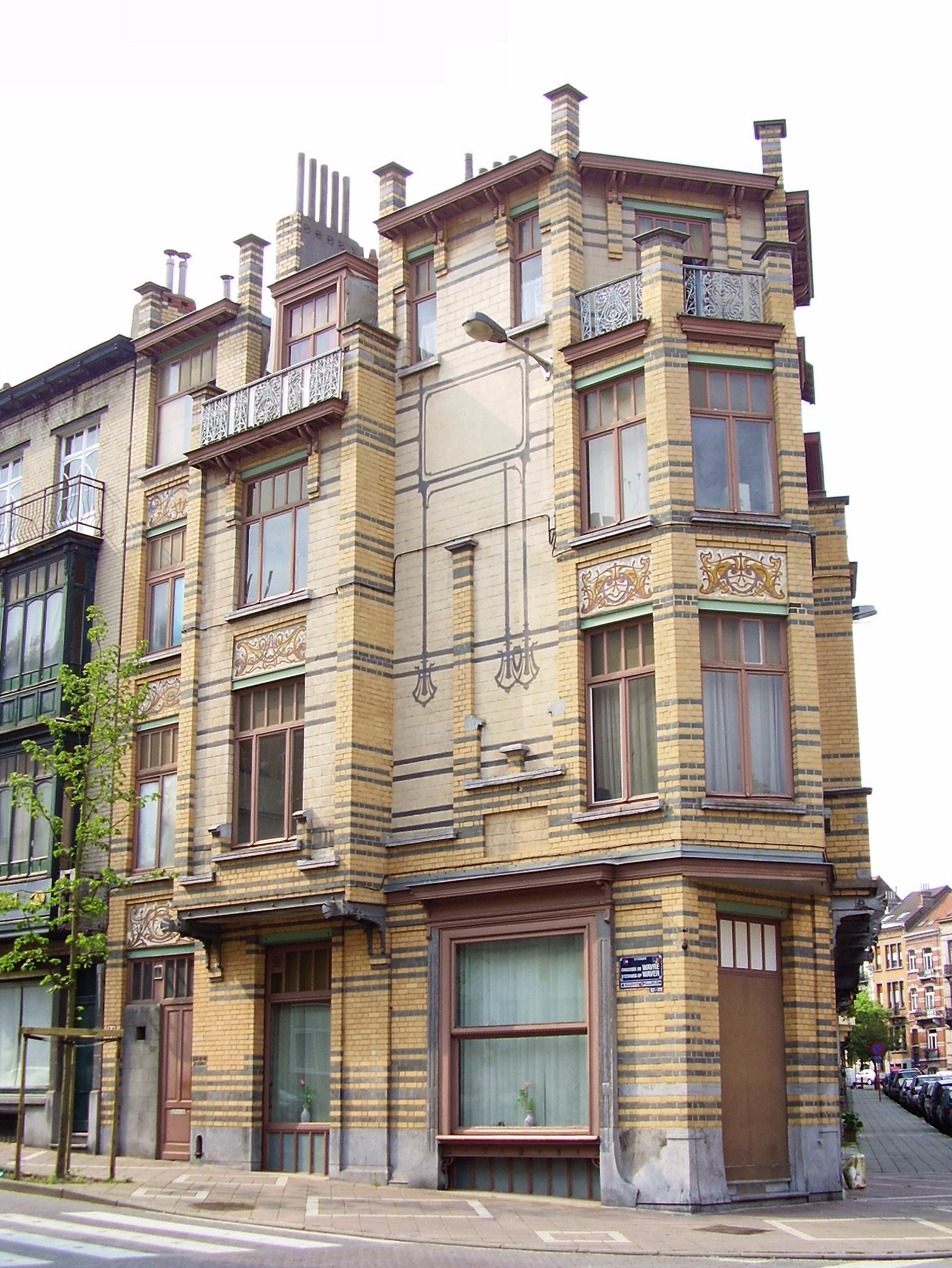
Private house, Chaussée de Wavre/Waversesteenweg, Etterbeek
