= Squares Quarter =

Neighbourhood in Brussels, Belgium

Squares Quarter: Quartier des Squares (French); Squareswijk (Dutch)
- Neighbourhood
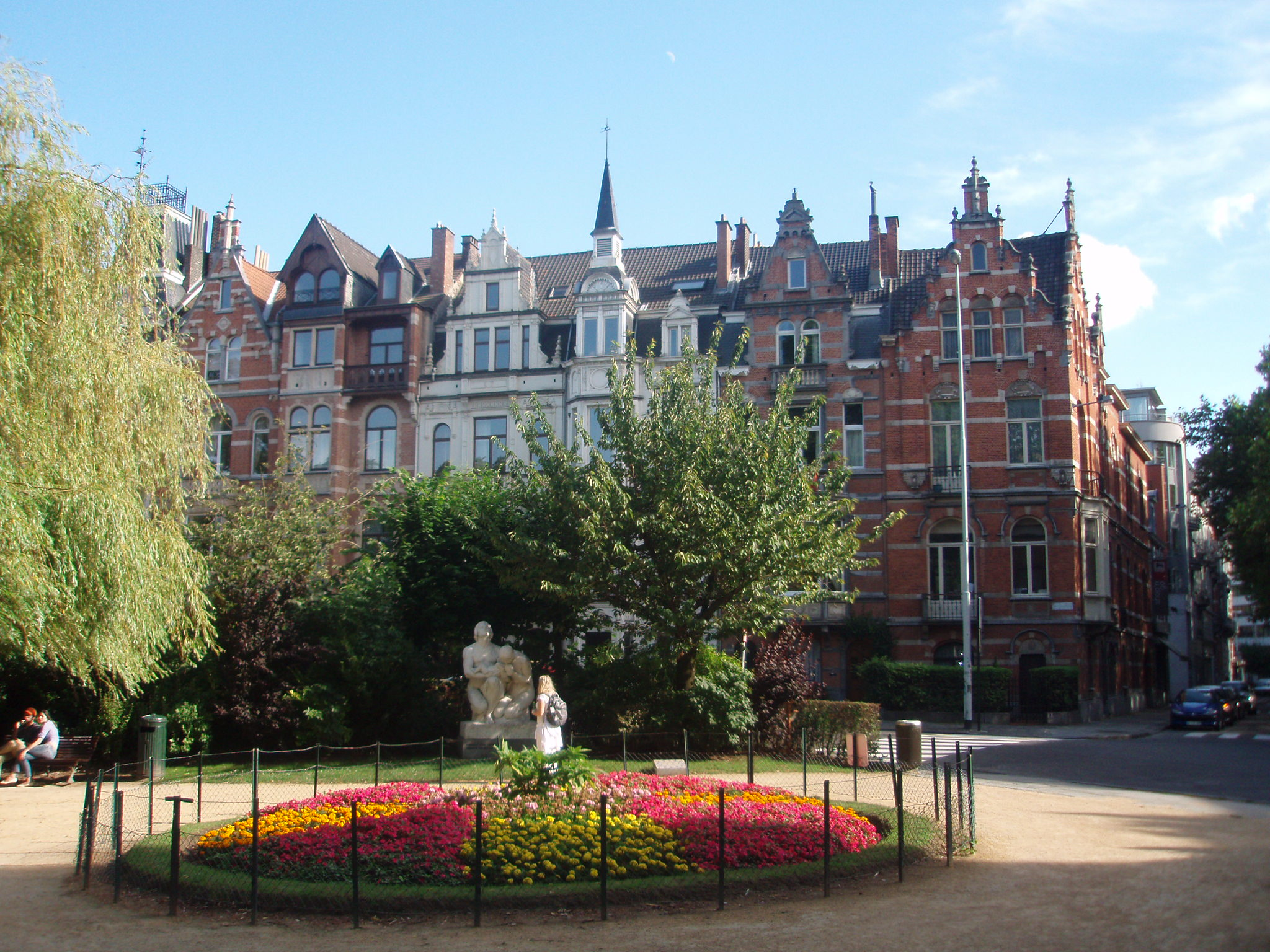
- Square Marie-Louise/Maria-Louizasquare

- Location within Brussels Squares Quarter (Belgium)
- Coordinates: 50°50′50″N 4°23′00″E
- Country: Belgium
- Region: Brussels-Capital Region
- Arrondissement: Brussels-Capital
- Municipality: City of Brussels
- Time zone: UTC+1 (CET)
  - Summer (DST): UTC+2 (CEST)
- Postal code: 1000
- Area codes: 02

The Squares Quarter (French: Quartier des Squares [kaʁtje de skwaʁ]; Dutch: Squareswijk [ˈskʋɛːrsˌʋɛik] or Wijk van de Squares [ˈʋɛik fɑn də ˈskʋɛːrs]) is a quarter of Brussels, Belgium. The district is the northern spur of the European Quarter, located between Saint-Josse-ten-Noode and the Leopold Quarter. It is bounded by the Chaussée de Louvain/Leuvense Steenweg to the north, the Rue du Noyer/Notelaarsstraat and the Avenue de Cortenbergh/Kortenberglaan to the east, the Rue Joseph II/Jozef II-straat and the Rue Stevin/Stevinstraat to the south, as well as the Small Ring (Brussels' inner ring road) to the west. The toponym refers to the many squares in the area, in particular the Square Ambiorix/Ambiorixsquare, the Square Marguerite/Margaretasquare, the Square Marie-Louise/Maria-Louizasquare and the Avenue Palmerston/Palmerstonlaan.

== History ==
The Squares Quarter was created following the eastern expansion of Brussels into the Maelbeek valley, a tributary of the Senne. As with the Senne itself, the Maelbeek was covered over between 1856 and 1872, as it was considered an obstacle to the urbanisation of Brussels' expanding suburbs. Several ponds were also filled in during this period; the pond in the Square Marie-Louise/Maria-Louizasquare, a remnant of the old pond of Saint-Josse or Hoeyvyver, is one of the last six remaining examples, surviving from what was once a network of 48 ponds throughout the city.

Following the urban expansion, the architect Gédéon Bordiau was commissioned to design a series of squares containing numerous gardens, embellished with water features and sculptures by prominent artists such as Constantin Meunier and Jef Lambeaux. In Bordiau's plans, all plots bordering the squares were subject to a non aedificandi easement, requiring a 5-metre (16 ft) setback zone on the alignment, intended for the creation of small gardens. The houses also had to feature picturesque façades with architectural elements such as projections, turrets, and other decorations. This planning approach contributed to a diverse architectural landscape. The predominant style is neo-Flemish Renaissance, along with examples of the Italian and French variants, as well as neo-Gothic and eclectic styles. There are also some Art Nouveau buildings.

After the Second World War, some of the original houses were demolished; they were replaced by small apartment buildings in the 1950s and high-rise buildings of more than ten storeys in the 1960s and 1970s, significantly altering the neighbourhood's appearance. Nevertheless, the area's proximity to the European institutions later prompted a renewed appreciation and revaluation of its architectural and urban significance. Despite the many demolitions they have undergone, the squares were classified as a site on 14 July 1994.

== The squares ==
=== Square Ambiorix ===
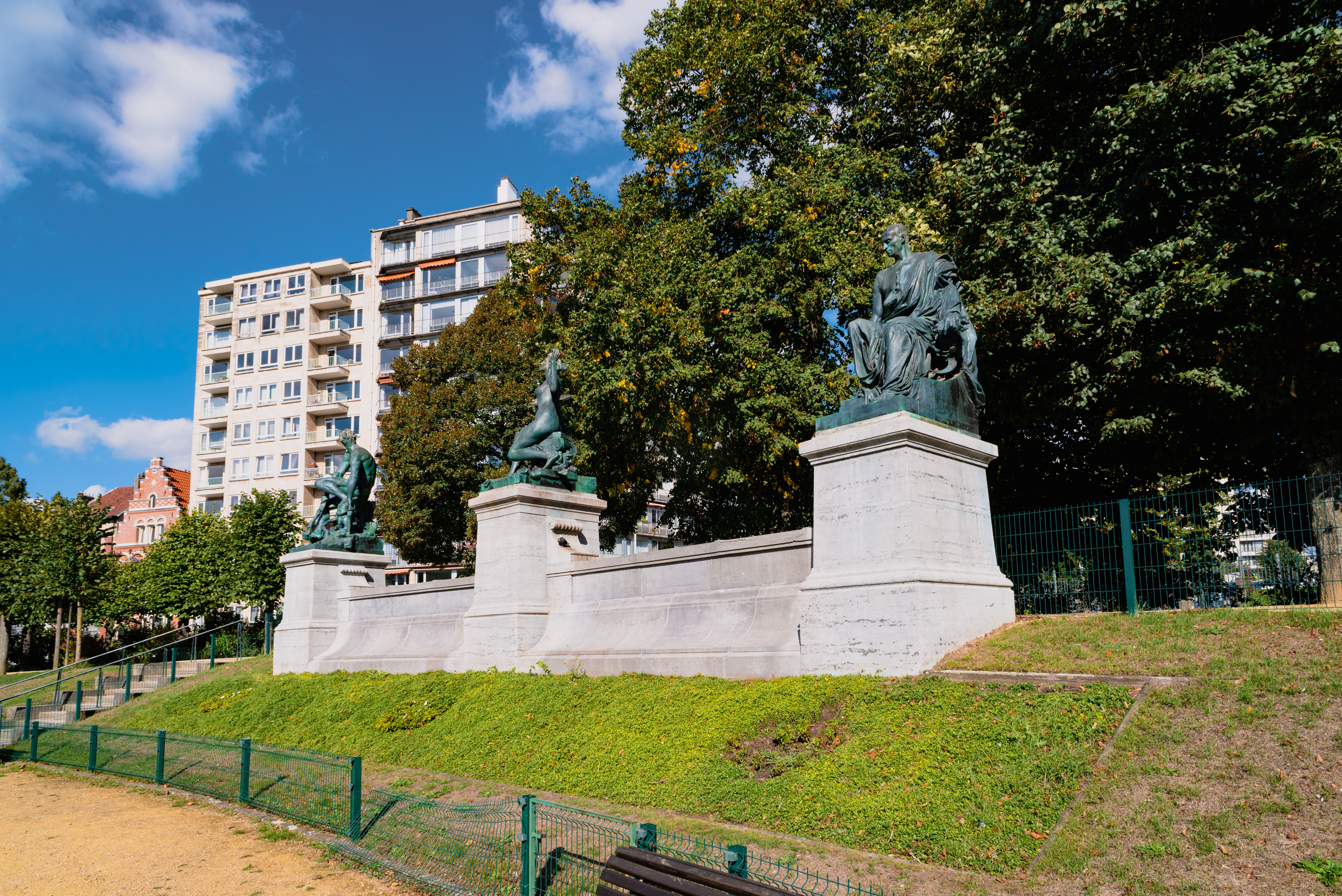
Square Ambiorix/Ambiorixsquare

The Square Ambiorix/Ambiorixsquare is the neighbourhood's central and most important square. Inspired by French gardens, it is composed of straight and arc-shaped paths, which delimit geometric spaces adorned with lawns, flowerbeds, fountains, sculptures, and a playground. It is named after the Belgic leader Ambiorix who, in the 19th century, became a Belgian national hero because of his resistance against Julius Caesar during the Gallic Wars. Several other streets in this district have Celtic-Gallic or medieval names (Boulevard Clovis/Clovislaan, Rue des Éburons/Eburonenstraat, and Boulevard Charlemagne/Karel de Grotelaan, for example).

=== Square Marguerite ===
Located in the eastern extension of the Square Ambiorix, the Square Marguerite/Margaretasquare is the smallest of the three squares that form the district's main axis. Originally intended to house a church, it has been converted into a recreational area consisting of a sports field and a playground. At the end of the square, there is a water basin surrounded by a pergola. Its name refers to either Margaret of York, third wife of Charles the Bold, Duke of Burgundy, or to the latter's granddaughter, Margaret of Austria.

=== Square Marie-Louise ===
The Square Marie-Louise/Maria-Louizasquare is the westernmost square and includes an English-style park with a large pond, which is home to Florida tortoises. This pond is undoubtedly the square's central feature, occupying an area of approximately 1.5 hectares (3.7 acres). A fountain emerging from a rock in the centre of the body of water, an artificial grotto overgrown with vegetation, and waterfalls cascading down into it give the site a truly picturesque appearance. Its name probably refers to Marie-Louise of Austria, Napoleon's second wife and as such Empress of the French and Queen of Italy.

=== Avenue Palmerston ===
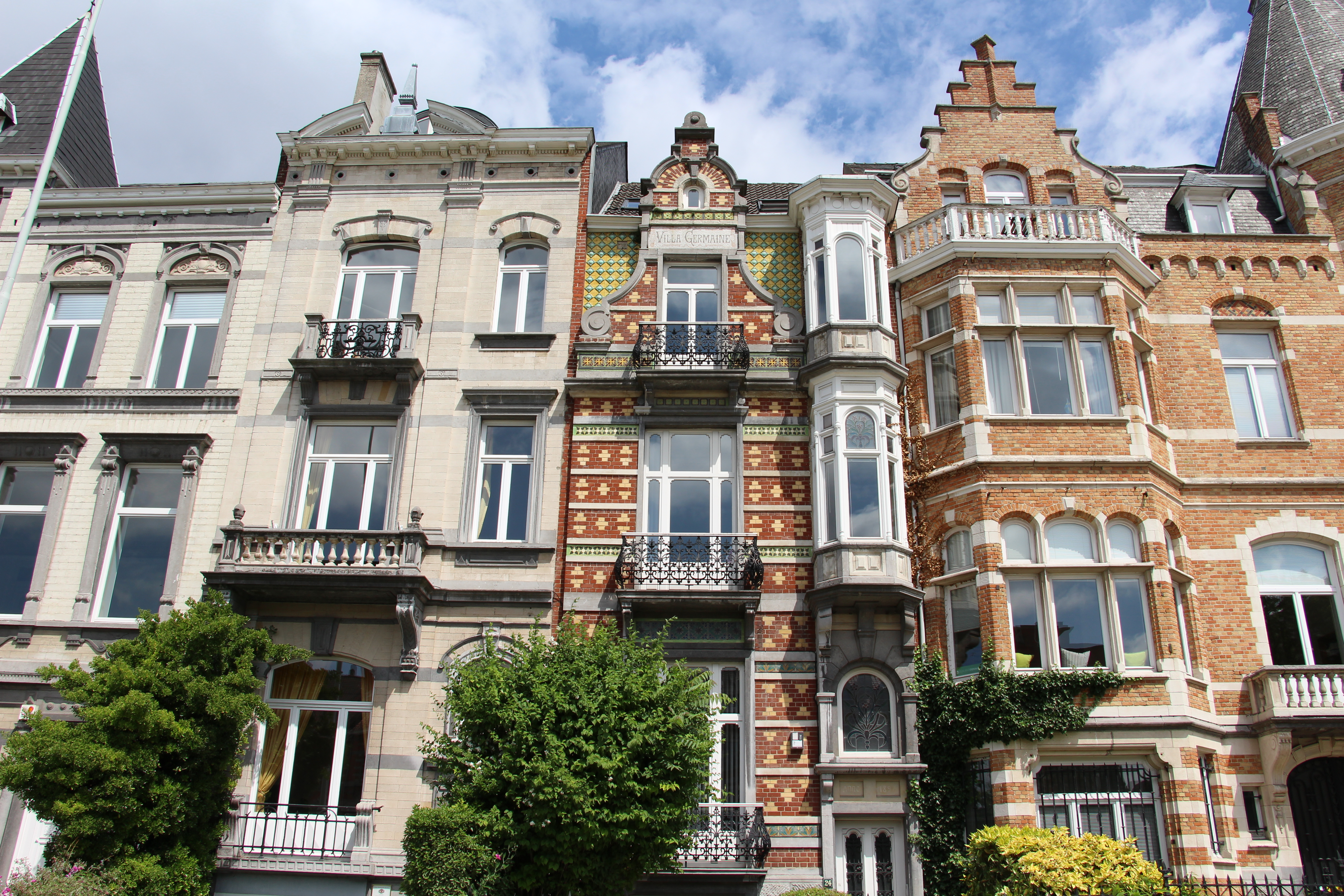
Avenue Palmerston/Palmerstonlaan

The Avenue Palmerston/Palmerstonlaan, also sometimes called the Square Palmerston/Palmerstonsquare, connects the Square Ambiorix to the Square Marie-Louise. Slightly sloping, this short thoroughfare includes a central island with two square water basins at each end and, in its centre, a bronze sculptural group. A dozen locust trees line the median strip, marking its boundary with the road. Its name pays tribute to Lord Palmerston, a British statesman and two-time prime minister who played an important political role in Belgian independence.

== Art Nouveau ==
The fact that Brussels was once the capital of Art Nouveau is clearly visible in the Squares Quarter, which was the meeting point of the Brussels bourgeoisie in the late 19th and early 20th centuries. On the Avenue Palmerston/Palmerstonlaan stands the Hôtel van Eetvelde (1901), which was designed by Victor Horta, and on the Square Ambiorix/Ambiorixsquare, the Saint-Cyr House (1903), designed by Gustave Strauven, a student of Horta. Other notable examples of the style include the Hôtel Deprez-Van de Velde (1899), also by Horta, the Quaker House (1899) by Georges Hobé, the Ramaekers House (1899) by Édouard Ramaekers, the Hôtel Defize (1900) by Léon Govaerts, as well as the Van Dijck House (1900) and the Strauven House (1902), both by Gustave Strauven.

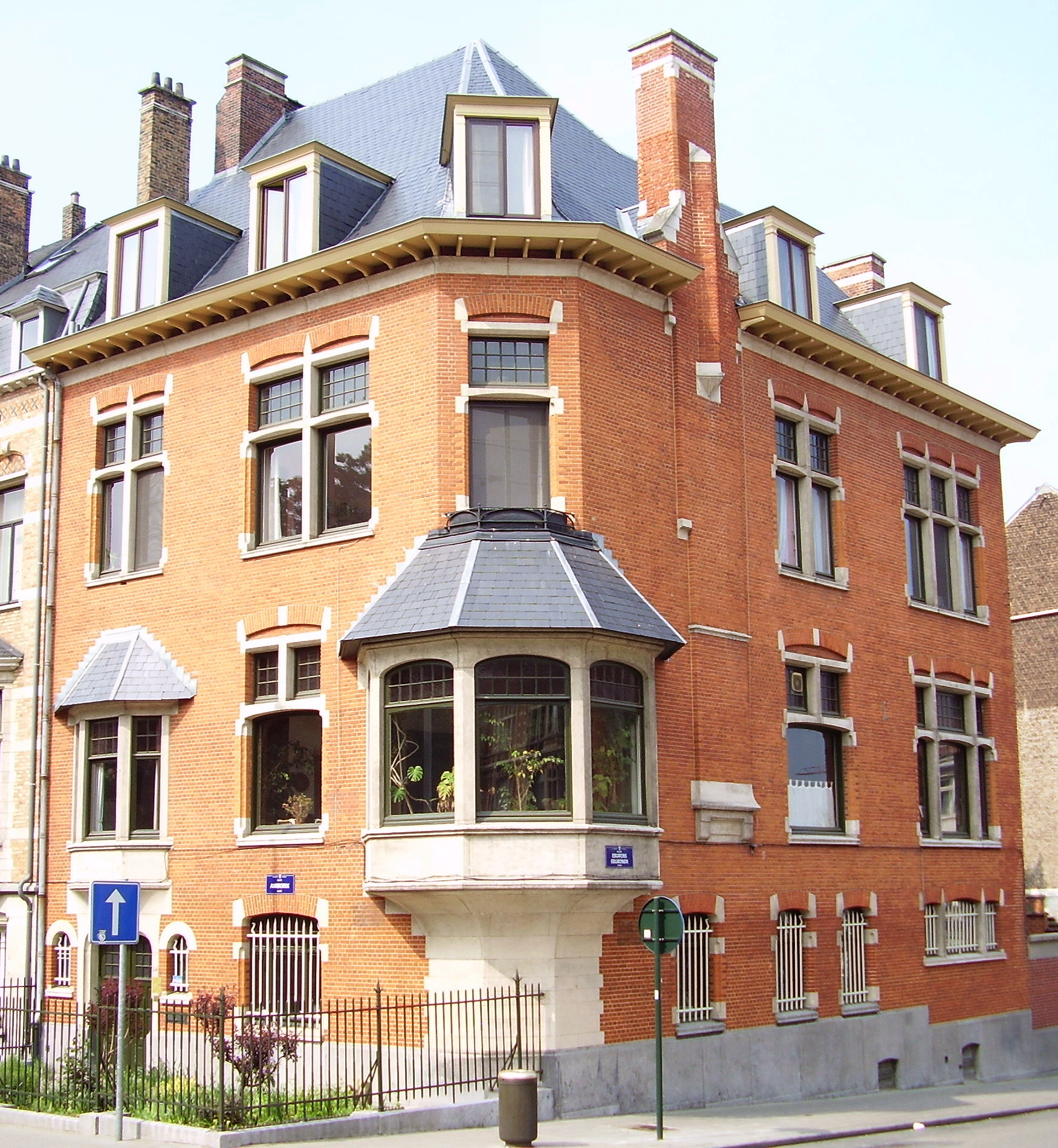
Quaker House (Hobé, 1899)

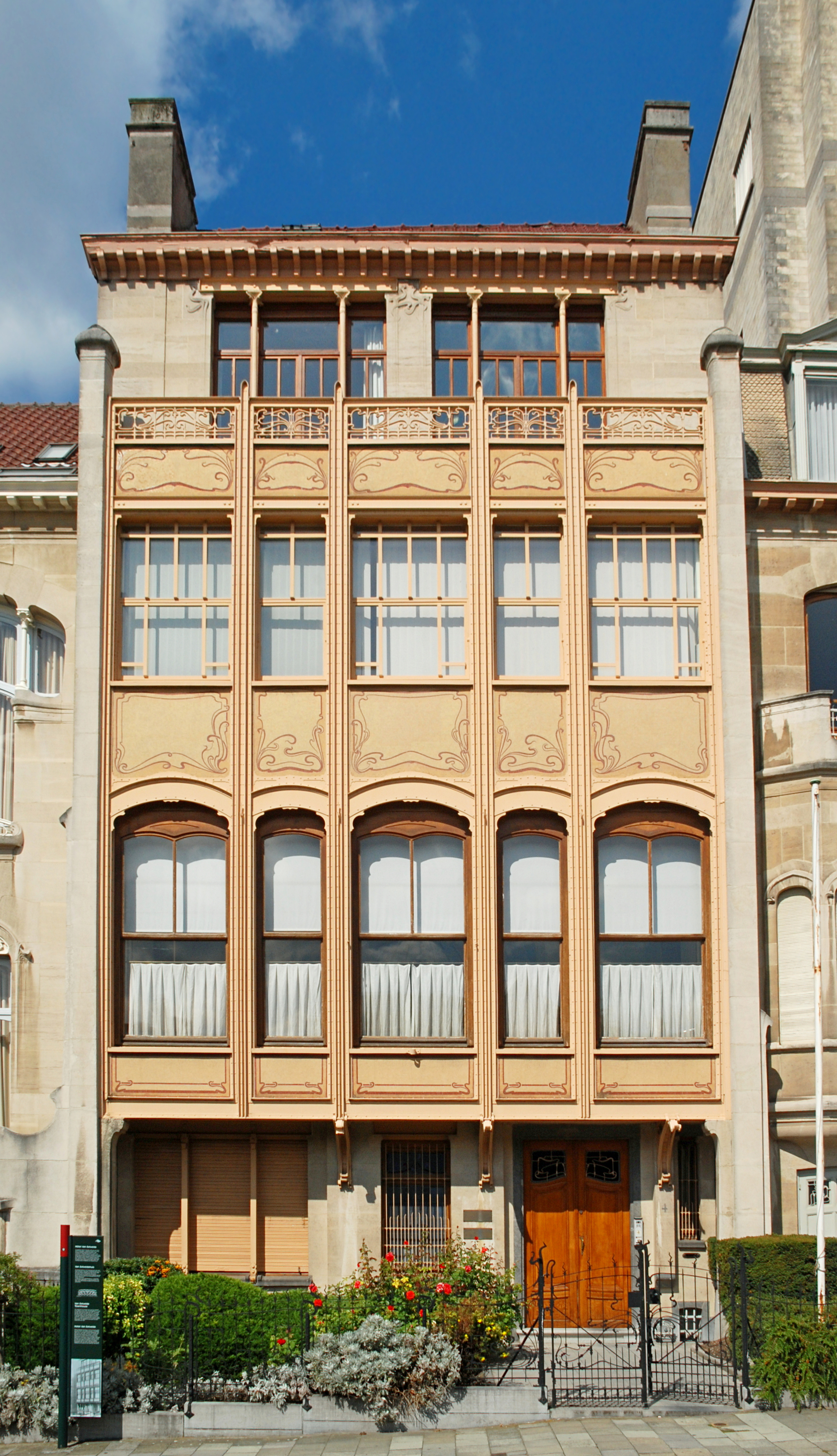
Hôtel van Eetvelde (Horta, 1901)

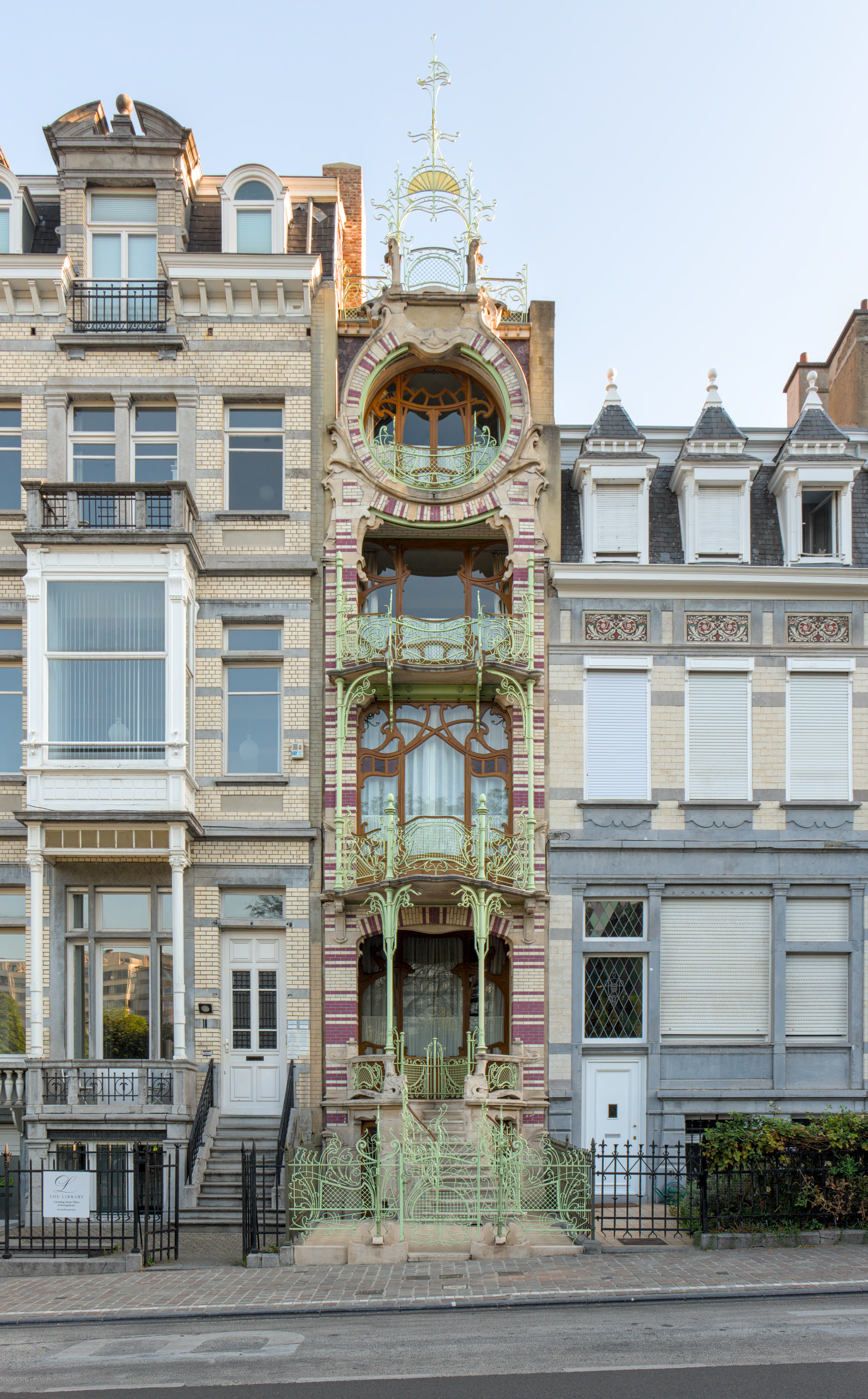
Saint-Cyr House (Strauven, 1903)

== See also ==
- Neighbourhoods in Brussels
- History of Brussels
- Culture of Belgium
- Belgium in the long nineteenth century
