= Émilie de Rodat =

French Roman Catholic saint

Saint Émilie de Rodat
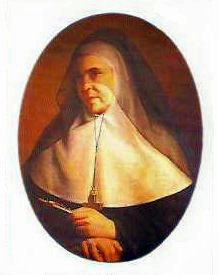

Virgin
- Born: 6 September 1787; Rodez, Aveyron, France
- Died: 19 September 1852 (aged 65); Villefranche-de-Rouergue, Aveyron, France
- Venerated in: Catholic Church
- Beatified: June 9, 1940
- Canonized: April 23, 1950 by Pope Pius XII
- Feast: 19 September

Émilie de Rodat (6 September 1787 – 19 September 1852), born Marie Guillemette (Wilhelmina) Emilie de Rodat, also known as Emily de Rodat, was a nun, virgin, mystic, and the founder of the Sisters of the Holy Family of Villefranche. She was born to a noble family near Rodez, in southern France. When she was 18 months old, she was sent to live with her maternal grandmother in Villefranche, to protect her from the oppression of Christians during the French Revolution. When she was 16, she had a spiritual experience, and at the age of 18, she became a teacher. In 1815, she started a school for poor girls in Villefranche, which became the Sisters of the Holy Family of Villefranche. Despite Rodat's spiritual and physical difficulties, the community expanded, eventually founding 38 houses, 25 cloistered communities, and 32 schools with over 5,000 students; they also visited prisoners and cared for abandoned infants in China. By 1999, there were 520 Sisters of the Holy Family of Villefranche worldwide.

Rodat's feast day is 19 September. She was beatified in 1940 and canonized in 1950.

== Early life ==
Émilie de Rodat was born on 6 September 1787, to a noble family, in "a handsome manor-house called Druelle" facing the plateau on which Rodez stands, in southern France. When she was 18 months old, at the beginning of the French Revolution, she was taken to live with her maternal grandmother in the Château of Ginals outside Villefranche, where her family lived in peace during the Revolution and Napoleon's reign because it was in a remote area and was relatively unscathed from the persecution of Catholics and other religious groups. Her aunt, a secularized nun due to religious oppression, also lived with them. Rodat was described as "a normally lively child with a strong but not excessive religious sensitivity" and "a pious young woman". She went to school in Maison Saint-Cyr in Villefranche, receiving a Christian education in secret due to the Revolution. When she was eleven, she received her First Communion. When she was 16, "her enthusiasm for religion cooled somewhat" and she changed confessors because she thought hers was too strict; after quarrelling with her grandmother, she returned to live with her parents at Ginals, where in 1804, she had a spiritual experience that drew her into religious life.

When Rodat was 18, she returned to Villefranche, where she became a lay teacher at Maison Saint-Cyr, where she had gone to school, for eleven years. She was in charge of the girls' recreation, taught geography, and prepared them for communion. According to hagiographer Agnes Dunbar, "She took the deepest interest in their spiritual progress, and never recommended them any penance without first performing it herself". She met the Abbé Marty, the school's spiritual director, who became her confessor from 1805 to 1839; with his support and encouragement, Rodat investigated joining three communities, but always returned to Villefranche because none seemed to suit her; she blamed herself for her "restlessness and instability". In the spring of 1815, she was inspired to start a school for girls after overhearing a group of poor women discussing how their daughters were growing up without religious instruction because they were unable to pay for it themselves and the Ursuline nuns that taught them for no cost were driven away during the Revolution. Rodat taught 40 students, with the help of three assistants, in her small room at Villefranche. This was the beginning of what became the Sisters of the Holy Family of Villefranche, also called the Sisters of Villefranche.

== Career and ministry ==
In May 1816, with the support of the Abbé Marty, Rodat rented her own building and started a free school for girls. Marty wrote a rule based upon the Rule of St. Augustine and "helped her to expand the focus of this new community". She was able to purchase the house at the Maison Saint-Cyr, which was closing, with 100 students and eight other sisters. Two years later, she was able to buy better buildings for her school, but the congregation's existence was threatened by a series of unexplained illnesses and deaths of the students and teachers that was attributed to "diabolic influence". Rodat was inclined to take this as a sign not to continue, and seriously considered merging the community with the Daughters of Mary, which had just been founded by Adèle de Batz de Trenquellèon. The sisters at Villefranche refused to accept any other abbess but Rodat, so the community was established, anyway. Rodat and her nuns took perpetual vows in the autumn of 1820, and according to church historian and hagiographer Alban Butler, they adopted a habit "of which the distinguishing feature was the transparent edge of the veil covering the upper part of the face". The first months of the Congregation did not go smoothly; according to Dunbar, "They were laughed at, jeered at, stoned". They were also threatened by legal action, some members of the Maison Saint-Cyr community were hostile to them, and they had to endure ridicule and criticism from lay people and clergy.

In 1832, the Sisters of the Holy Family of Villefranche was formally approved by the bishop of Rodez. It was reported that Rodat had "great faith in God’s providential care and money and materials seemed to miraculously appear when needed". Founding schools were their main focus, but they gradually expanded to other ministries. They began to visit prisoners in 1863, "with encouraging results", opened orphanages, rescue homes for prostitutes, and a retirement home for "aged religious". Rodat also founded groups of contemplative nuns to pray for the community's charitable works, "seeing in the two branches a personification of Martha and Mary". By 1852, there were 32 Villefranche convents that ran schools, and five contemplative communities.

Rodat "had to endure a lot both spiritually, health-wise and in her work" throughout her life. She developed cancer in her left eye, a cancerous tumor in her nose, and an unknown disease, probably Ménière's disease, which gave her permanent tinnitus in her ears. Her health difficulties, along with the loss of direct support from the Abbé Marty when he was appointed vicar general of the diocese of Rodez, caused her to experience a "period of spiritual despair". A life of intense prayer brought her inner peace of mind, but outwardly she seemed sullen, strict, and unattractive; she was sometimes careless with her personal appearance, especially how she dressed, to counteract her pride, what she perceived as her main weakness. One of her supervisors said that "she was a saint, but a stubborn saint". She was prone to arguments with even her supporters like the Abbé Marty due to "the uncompromising side of her personality", but responded politely to her critics. Few people knew that she was a "mystic with tremendous healing powers."

In April 1852, after 30 years as head of the community she founded, Rodat retired due to the development of cancer in her left eye and a tumor. At the time, the Villefranche Sisters had begun working with abandoned infants in China, a work she was greatly interested in. She died on 19 September 1852, at the age of 65, and was buried in the crypt in the chapel of the first home she founded in Villefrance, which became a pilgrimage destination and where many people received prayers through her. At the time of her death, there were 38 houses, 25 cloistered communities, and 32 schools with over 5,000 students sponsored by the Sisters of the Holy Family of Villefranche in several countries. Streets in her home district, including Villefranche and Rodez, were named after her. As of 1999, there were 520 Sisters of the Holy Family of Villefranche worldwide.

Rodat's feast day is 19 September; it is celebrated in the house of Holy Family of Villefranche the third Sunday in September. She was beatified on 9 June 1940 and canonized by Pope Pius XII on 23 April 1950.

== Works cited ==
- Butler, Alban (1991). Butler's Lives of the Saints (5th edition), Michael Walsh, ed. San Francisco: Harper. ISBN 0814623778. OCLC 33824974
