= Marianist Family =

Group of four Catholic organizations

The Marianist Family is a group of four Catholic organizations which trace their origins to the Blessed William Joseph Chaminade and Blessed Adèle de Batz de Trenquelléon.

The Family's four branches are: the Society of Mary (Marianists) (S.M.), a religious institute of priests and religious brothers - an interesting and perhaps unique characteristic of the Society is that the priests and brothers are all equal; in most cases the superior, a Director or a Provincial, may be either a priest or a brother; all members ultimately take four vows - poverty, chastity, obedience, and stability; the Daughters of Mary Immaculate (F.M.I., or also known as Marianist Sisters), an institute of religious sisters; the Alliance Mariale (A.M.), an historically all-female secular institute, composed of laypeople, who "dedicate their lives to God by taking vows while living in the world"; and the Marianist Lay Communities (M.L.C.), a private association of the faithful for both men and women.
