= Instituto Chaminade Marianistas =

Location
- Callao; Peru

Information
- School type: Technical School
- Established: 1997; 28 years ago

El Instituto Chaminade Marianistas is a technical school in the Santa Rosa urbanization of Callao, Peru. It was founded in 1997 by the Marianists to allow for further education to Peruvian students in order to pursue future jobs in technical areas, such as hardware support, accounting, marketing, or bilingual clerical work. The first class graduated in 2001.
