= William Joseph Chaminade =

French Catholic priest (1761–1850)

Blessed William Joseph Chaminade S.M.
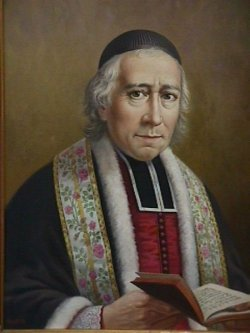

Priest and Founder
- Born: Guillaume-Joseph Chaminade; 8 April 1761; Périgueux, Périgord, Kingdom of France
- Died: 22 January 1850 (aged 88); Bordeaux, France
- Venerated in: Catholic Church
- Beatified: 3 September 2000, Saint Peter's Square, Vatican City by Pope John Paul II
- Feast: 22 January
- Attributes: Priestly attire Books; Rosary
- Patronage: Society of Mary

Guillaume-Joseph Chaminade, SM (also known as William Joseph Chaminade; Périgueux, 8 April 1761 – Bordeaux, 22 January 1850) was a French Catholic priest who survived persecution during the French Revolution and later founded the Society of Mary, usually called the Marianists, in 1817. He was beatified by Pope John Paul II on 3 September 2000. His feast day is celebrated on 22 January.

The Marianist Family's other three branches — the religious sisters known as the Daughters of Mary Immaculate, the married and single men and women of the Marianist Lay Communities, and the consecrated laywomen of the Alliance Mariale — also look to Chaminade as a founder or inspiration.

== Early life ==
Chaminade was born in 1761 in Périgueux to Catherine Bethon and Blaise Chaminade, in the former province of Périgord, now the Department of Dordogne. He was the 14th child of deeply religious parents. Three of his brothers became priests. Feeling called to serve in this way as well, he entered a minor seminary in Mussidan at the age of ten. He was ordained a priest in 1785 for the local diocese.

== Revolutionary era ==
In 1790, after the start of the French Revolution, Chaminade moved to Bordeaux. There he became an enemy of the state by defying the Civil Constitution of the Clergy, which would have required him to take an oath affirming the Revolution's secular values and disclaiming the authority of the Roman Catholic Church. He secretly continued to work as a priest, risking a possible death penalty. One of his allies in this work was Marie-Thérèse Charlotte de Lamourous, whom he later assisted in founding Bordeaux's Miséricorde (House of Mercy) for "fallen women".

In 1795, when the national government sought to work with the non-juring clergy, Chaminade accepted responsibility for supervising the reconciliation of the clergy of Bordeaux who had taken the Constitutional Oath but wanted to make peace with the Catholic Church; about fifty such priests completed their reconciliation with his help. After the Coup of 18 Fructidor by the French Directory in 1797, he fled the country and found refuge for three years in Zaragoza, Spain.

While living there, he would regularly visit the Basilica of Our Lady of the Pillar out of his strong devotion to the Blessed Virgin Mary. As a result of his prayer he developed a vision for restoring the Catholic faith to France. To this end, he decided to build an organization of both lay and religious Order members, taking the Virgin Mary as the model of a perfect disciple of Jesus.

== Founder ==
When he returned to Bordeaux in November 1800, he re-established the Marian Sodality, which he hoped would promote the desecularization of France by offering "the spectacle of a people of saints". He saw the development of the young lay movement as the prime focus of his mission. In this he was opposed by the traditionalist forces in the Church, both clergy and lay, who saw the re-creation of the privileges and institutions of the pre-Revolutionary Church as the true goal of their restoration of the faith in France. In 1824 Chaminade published a reply to that line of thinking in which he stated, "The levers that move the moral world somehow need a new fulcrum."

The sodality spread to other cities, and the Holy See recognized his efforts by appointing him Apostolic Administrator of the Diocese of Bazas and later, in 1801, naming him an "Apostolic Missionary" to the region, confirming its trust in him.

Some sodalitists wanted to make a more complete commitment to the Church, so Chaminade, along with the Adèle de Batz de Trenquelléon, founded the Institute of the Daughters of Mary Immaculate in Agen in 1816. A year later, he founded the Society of Mary at Bordeaux. Both religious institutes devoted themselves to teaching. Chaminade sought to establish a network of schools to train Catholic teachers, but this effort was checked by the 1830 Revolution. However, both of Chaminade's religious institutes continued to grow: the Daughters of Mary founded schools in south-western France to educate rural women and the Society of Mary expanded in France and spread to Switzerland(1839) and the United States of America (1849).

== Death ==
The last ten years of Chaminade's life were filled with problems of health, finances and obstacles to his vision in the administration of the Society. He was replaced in January 1846 as Superior General by a General Chapter, which he considered illegitimate, called by members of the General Council of the Society, with the approval of the Holy See. Partially paralyzed, he thereafter was left in virtual isolation by the government of the Society.

Chaminade died in Bordeaux in 1850, surrounded by members of the Society he had founded. His tomb is located in the city.

== Veneration ==
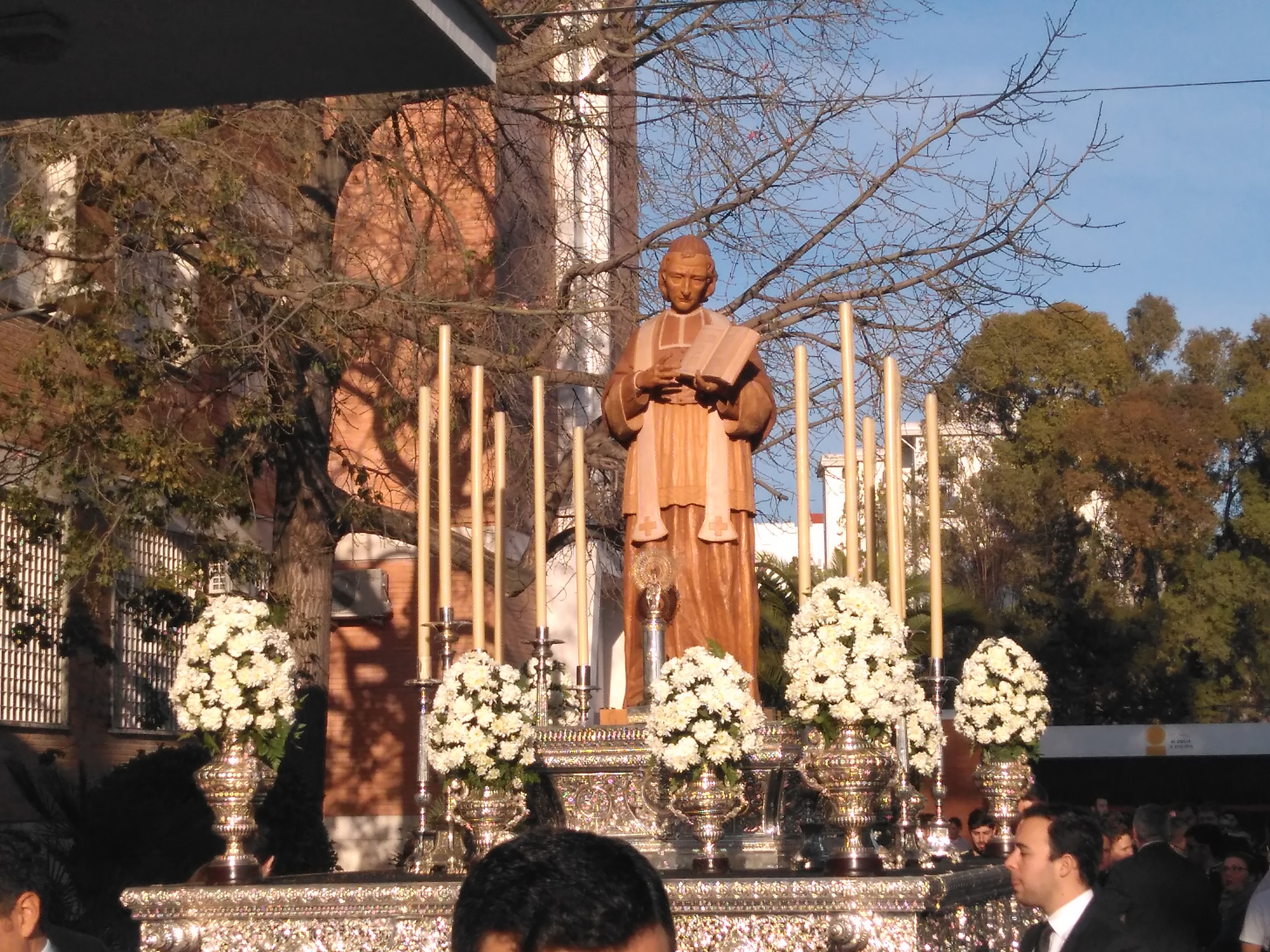
Procession

The process of inquiry for the cause of Chaminade's canonization was opened in 1909, with testimony taken in until 1912 in France and Spain, where he had lived. Chaminade's spiritual writings were approved by theologians on 3 March 1916, and his cause was officially opened in Rome on 8 May 1918, granting him the title of Servant of God. Study on the matter continued until 1973, when Chaminade was declared Venerable by Pope Paul VI.

=== Miracle worker ===
==== Argentina ====
In 1995 the healing from lung cancer of Elena Otera, a resident of Buenos Aires, was studied as a possible miracle to be attributed to the intercession of Chaminade. After a positive conclusion in the local inquiry conducted by the Marianist Postulator of the cause, the matter was referred to the Vatican for investigation. The medical boards consulted by the Congregation for the Causes of Saints finally declared her healing as "scientifically inexplicable" in January 1999. A review of the cause then took place by the theologians and bishops of the Congregation. They voted unanimously in favor of declaring a miracle that following October. This was approved by Pope John Paul II, who beatified Chaminade in 2000.

==== United States ====
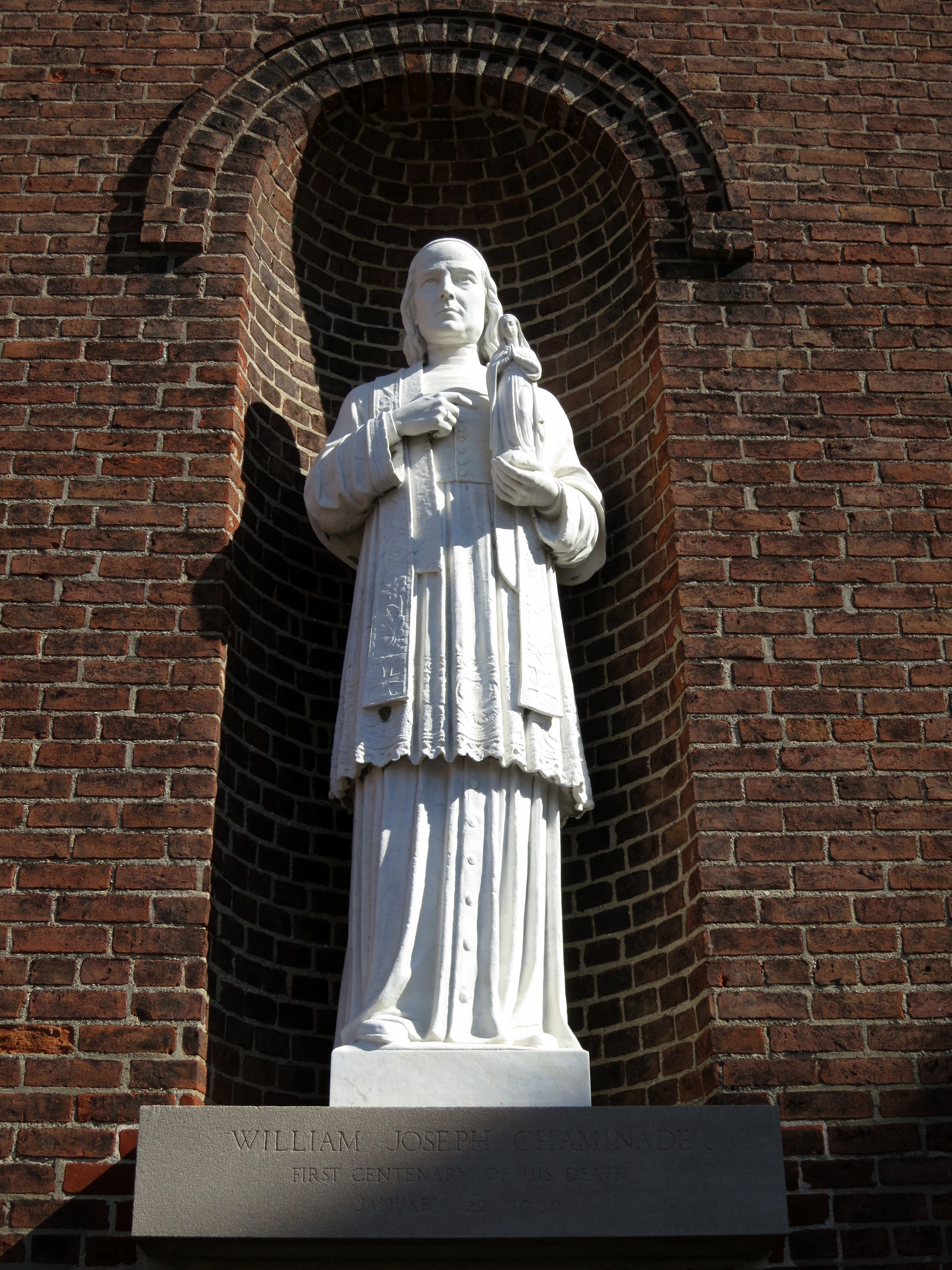
A statue of Chaminade adorns the Chapel of the Immaculate Conception at the University of Dayton.

Rachel Baumgartner, then a high school student in St. Louis, Missouri, in the United States, was diagnosed in December 1998 with Askin's tumor, a kind of sarcoma. She underwent emergency surgery to have the tumor removed, followed by chemotherapy and radiation. She was a member of the Parish of Our Lady of the Pillar, founded and staffed by the Marianists, and was chosen to attend the ceremony for Chaminade's beatification in Rome in 2000. Early the next year the tumor was found to have re-appeared in her bone marrow, for which she underwent a stem cell transplant, which had a severe negative impact on her health. The tumor was found to have re-developed between her heart, lung and spine in November 2002.

Baumgartner was advised that no one had ever survived when this occurred after such a transplant, and that she had only a few weeks to live. After a year and a half, however, the tumor (which was the size of a small Nerf football) stopped growing and had not damaged the organs around it. In 2004 a noted surgeon removed the tumor, finding that it had died with almost no treatment, which was medically unexplainable. Baumgartner, now married and named Rachel Lozano, attributed this to the intercession of Chaminade. The Marianist pastor of the parish referred this matter to the Superior General of the Society of Mary, who in turn requested that the local bishop, the Archbishop of St. Louis, conduct a formal inquiry. The investigation was concluded in July 2010 and forwarded by the Archdiocese and the Marianists to Rome for judgment.
