= Saint-Cyr House =

Historic Art Nouveau house in Brussels, Belgium

- Maison Saint-Cyr (French); Huis Saint-Cyr (Dutch)
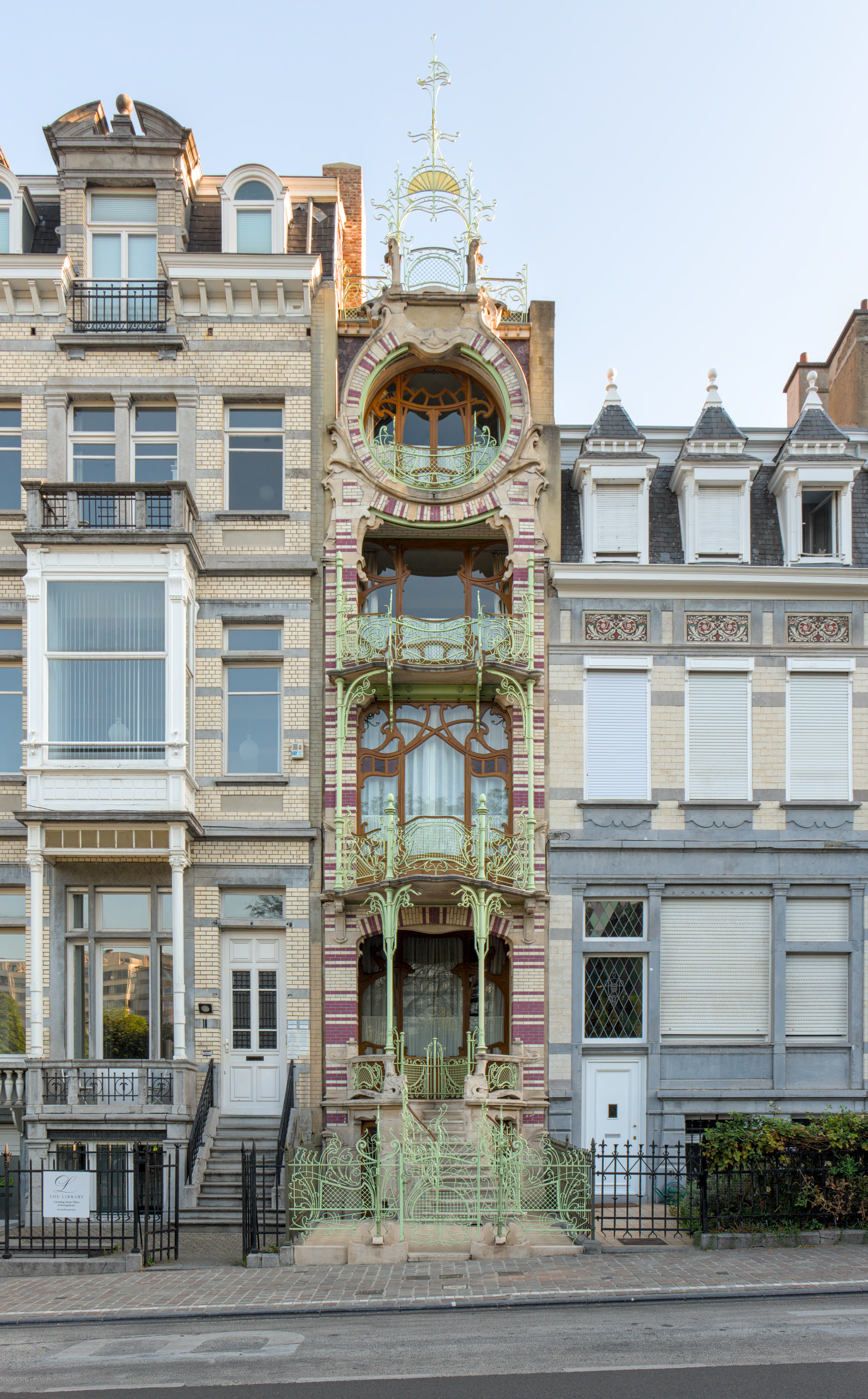
- The Saint-Cyr House (centre) with its two neighbours
- Interactive map of the Saint-Cyr House area

General information
- Type: Town house
- Architectural style: Art Nouveau
- Location: Square Ambiorix / Ambiorixsquare 11, 1000 City of Brussels, Brussels-Capital Region, Belgium
- Coordinates: 50°50′52″N 4°23′02″E
- Construction started: February 1901
- Completed: July 1903
- Client: George Léonard de Saint-Cyr

Design and construction
- Architect: Gustave Strauven
- Designations: Protected (08/08/1988)

Renovating team
- Architect: Francis Metzger
- Renovating firm: Metzger et Associés Architecture

The Saint-Cyr House (French: Maison Saint-Cyr; Dutch: Huis Saint-Cyr or Saint-Cyrhuis) is a historic town house in Brussels, Belgium. It was designed by the architect Gustave Strauven, and built between 1901 and 1903, in Art Nouveau style. It is Strauven's most important building, and served as a private residence for the painter and decorator George Léonard de Saint-Cyr.

The house is located at 11, square Ambiorix/Ambiorixsquare in the Squares Quarter (eastern part of the City of Brussels).

== History ==
The Saint-Cyr House was designed and built by the architect Gustave Strauven, who began his career as an assistant designer working with Victor Horta. It was built to serve as a private residence for the painter and decorator George Léonard de Saint-Cyr. Work began in February 1901 and the house was declared complete by the City of Brussels in July 1903.

Always coveted by architecture enthusiasts, the building, listed as a historic monument on 8 August 1988, has had several owners. In 1909, the Leurs family, a pawnbroker, bought it from the painter. The dancer Chamie Lee acquired it in the 1950s and transformed the ground floor into a dance hall for her classes. An antique dealer from Etterbeek became the owner in 2003 to resell it in 2006 to the Antwerp agency Movast, specialising in historic buildings. The house had been in a poor state of repair, but as of March 2013, has been restored to its former splendour by the architect Francis Metzger, from the architectural office MA² - Metzger et Associés Architecture.

== Description ==
The Saint-Cyr House is only 4 metres (13 ft) wide, but was given extraordinary height through Strauven's elaborate architectural inventions. The façade, marked by a flamboyant Art Nouveau style, is entirely covered by polychrome bricks and has a large amount of wrought iron, which is adorned with geometric motifs and ornate balustrades at each floor. The wrought iron mimics vegetation and the decorative elements occupy all the space available. Due to its extravagance, the building has been called Art Nouveau-Baroque. The interior is characterised by different styles, varying according to the rooms.

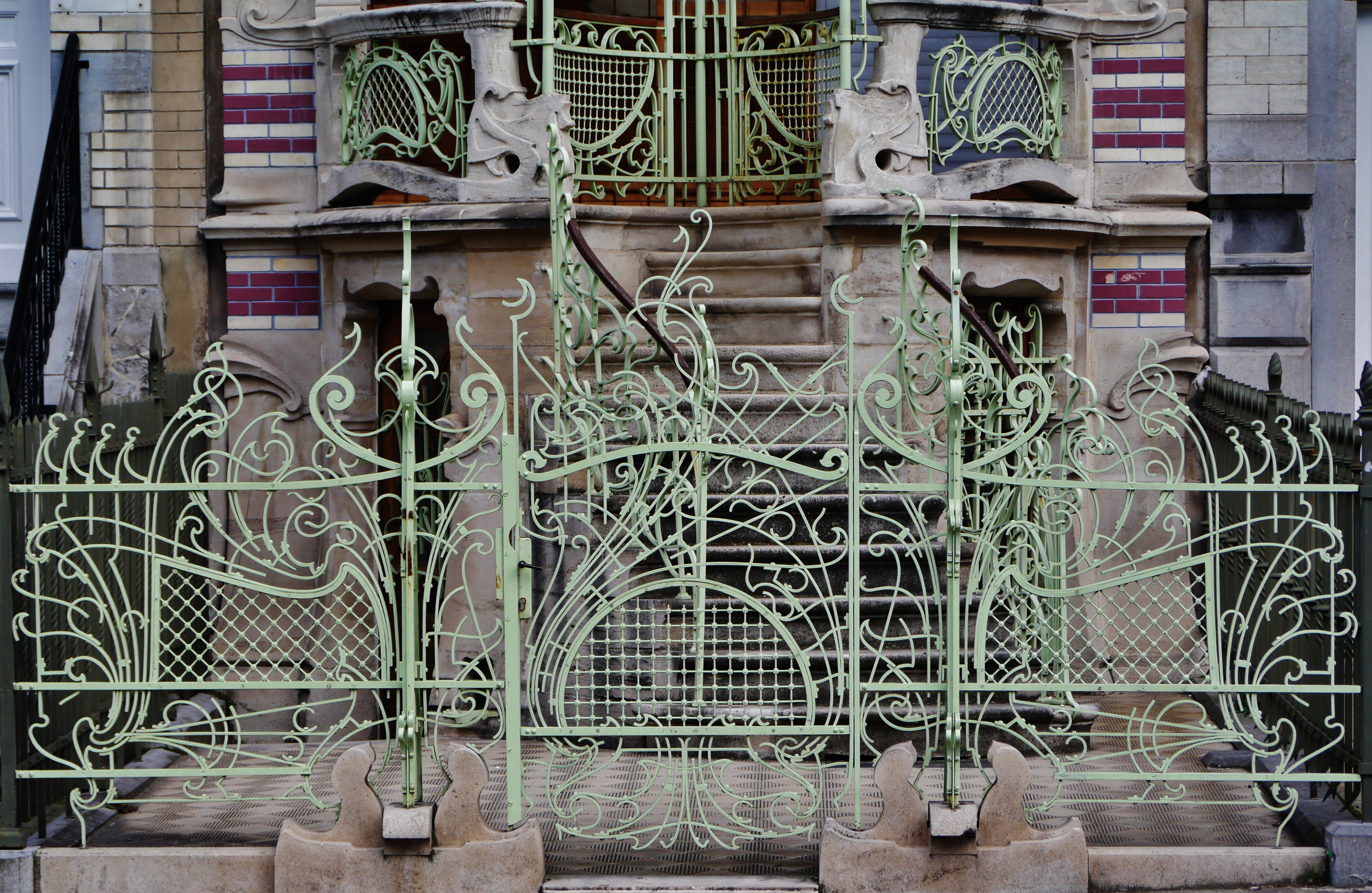
Entrance fence

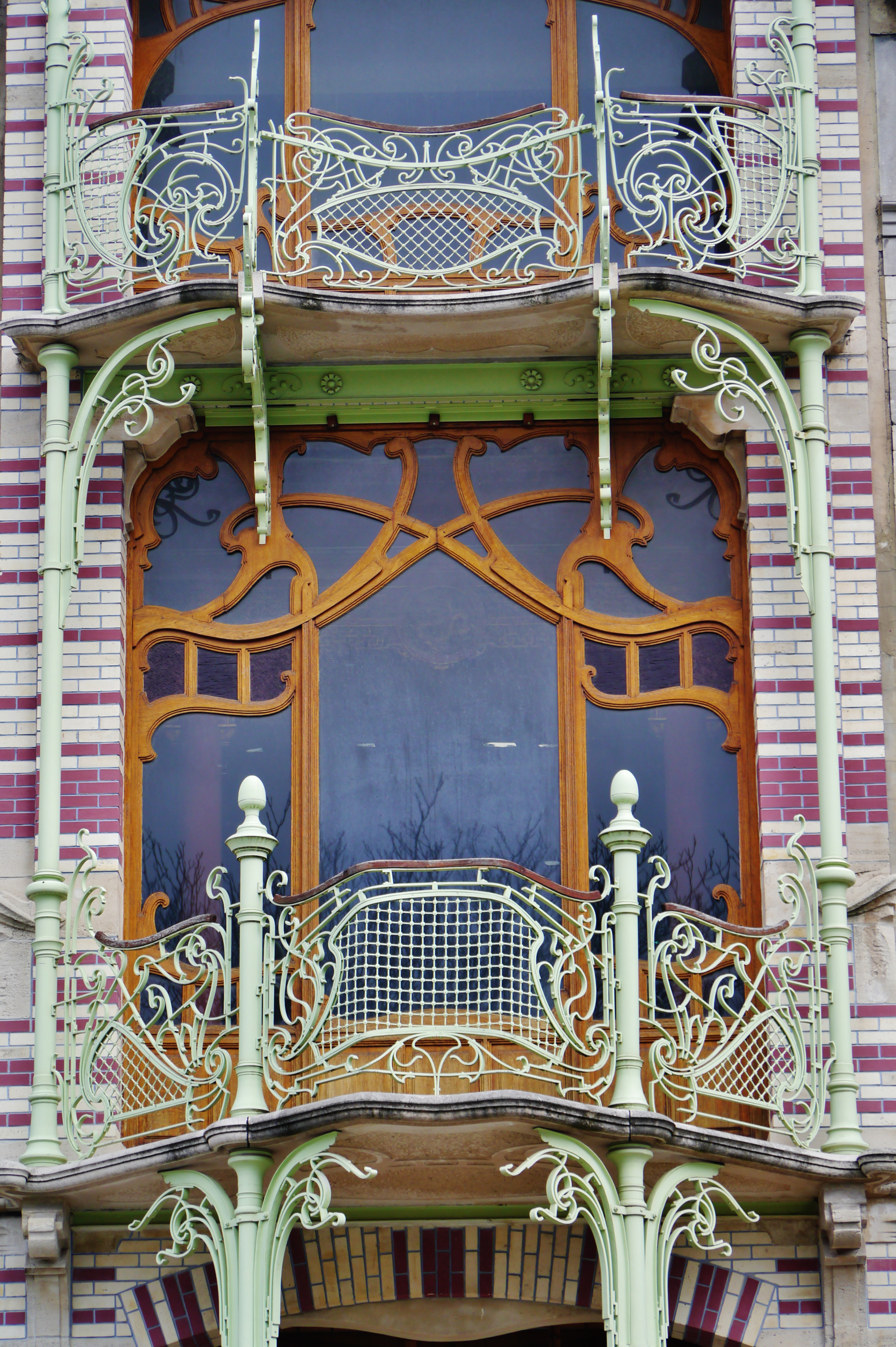
Wrought iron balconies

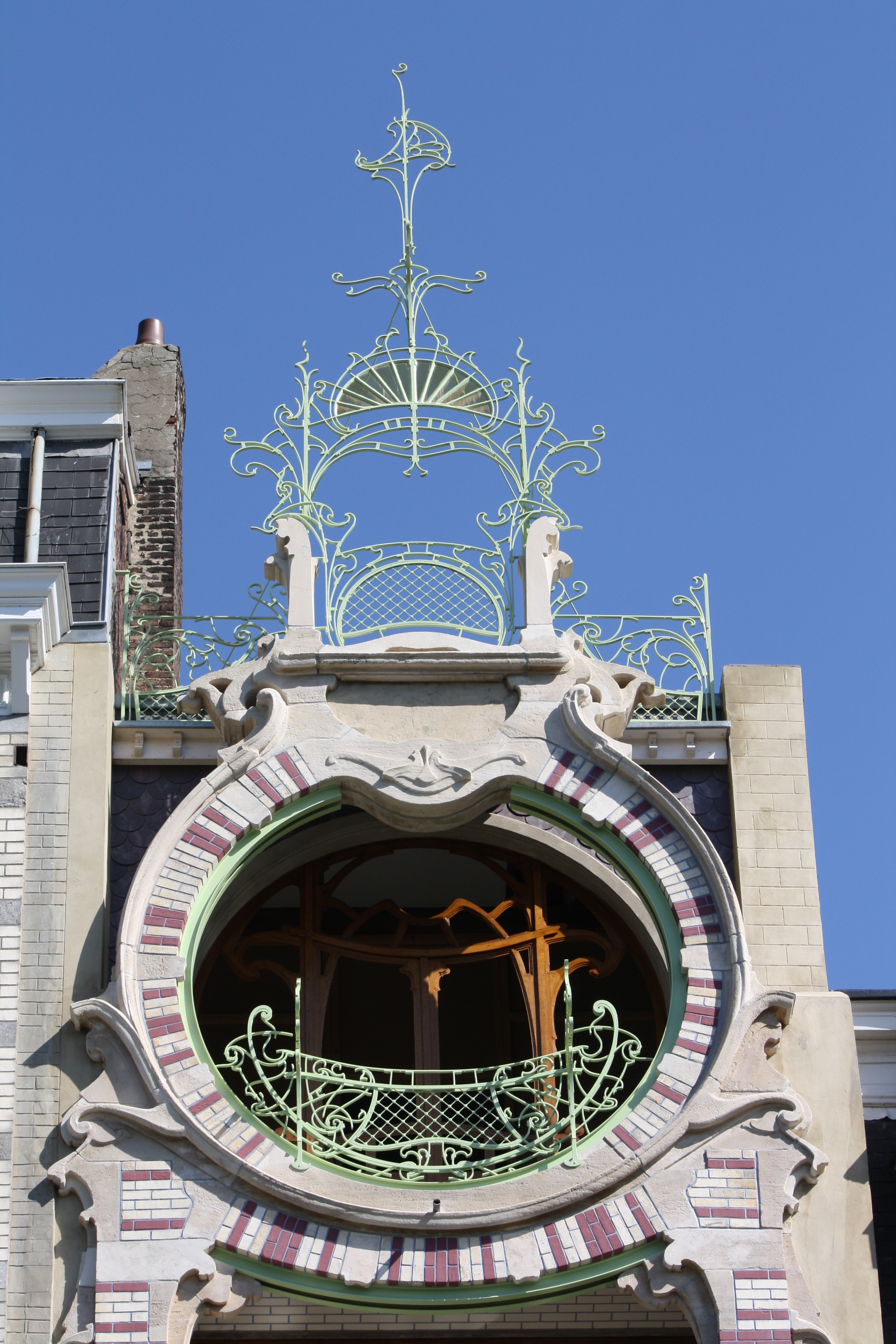
Gable

== See also ==
- Art Nouveau in Brussels
- History of Brussels
- Culture of Belgium
- Belgium in the long nineteenth century
