= Society of Mary (Marianists) =

Catholic clerical religious congregation

- Societas Mariae (Latin)
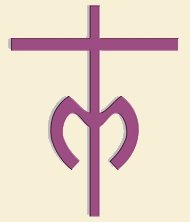
- Marianist Cross, symbol of the Society of Mary
- Abbreviation: S.M. (post-nominal letters)
- Nickname: Marianists
- Formation: 2 October 1817; 208 years ago
- Founder: Blessed Fr. Guillaume Joseph Chaminade, S.M.
- Founded at: Bordeaux, France
- Type: Clerical religious congregation of pontifical right (for men)
- Location(s): General Motherhouse Via Latina 22, 00179 Rome, Italy
- Coordinates: 41°54′4.9″N 12°27′38.2″E
- Members: 930 members (309 priests) as of 2020
- Motto: Latin: Servire Quam Sentire; English: Serve with Feeling
- Superior General: Rev. Fr. André Fétis, S.M.
- Ministry: Education, youth ministry, pastoral work, social justice
- Patron saints: Mary, Mother of Jesus; Saint Joseph; Saint John the Evangelist
- Main organ: General Administration
- Parent organization: Roman Catholic Church
- Website: www.marianist.org
- Remarks: Part of the Marianist Family, alongside the Daughters of Mary Immaculate, Alliance Mariale, and Marianist Lay Communities

The Society of Mary (Latin: Societas Mariae), abbreviated S.M., is a Catholic clerical religious congregation of pontifical right for men, whose members are commonly known as the Marianists. Its members include both brothers and priests, who append the post-nominal letters "S.M." to their names.

The society was founded in Bordeaux, France, on 2 October 1817 by Blessed William Joseph Chaminade, a priest who sought to rebuild Catholic life in the aftermath of the French Revolution. The Society of Mary is one of the four branches of the Marianist Family, together with the Daughters of Mary Immaculate, Alliance Mariale, and Marianist Lay Communities.

The Marianists are especially associated with education, youth ministry, retreat work, parish ministry, and social outreach. Their spirituality emphasizes community life, mission, and devotion to Mary as a model of Christian discipleship.

== History ==
The Society of Mary was founded by William Joseph Chaminade in post-Revolutionary France. During the French Revolution, Chaminade experienced exile and anti-clerical persecution; these experiences strongly shaped his vision for renewing Christian faith through communities of laity and religious working together.

Chaminade first organized lay sodalities in Bordeaux as a means of rebuilding Catholic life. From this foundation developed two religious institutes: the Daughters of Mary Immaculate for women and, in 1817, the Society of Mary for men. The new congregation was conceived as an apostolic body dedicated above all to evangelization and education, especially through communities that would bear witness to the Christian life.

The society expanded beyond France during the 19th century, establishing houses and schools elsewhere in Europe and later in North America, Latin America, Africa, and Asia. It received papal approval as a religious congregation in 1891.

By the 20th and 21st centuries, the Marianists had become an international congregation active in schools, universities, retreat centers, parishes, and various social ministries. Their contemporary work places particular emphasis on collaboration with lay members of the Marianist Family, inculturation, and service to the poor.

== Charism and spirituality ==
The spirituality of the Society of Mary is rooted in the thought of Chaminade and in Marian devotion. Marianists regard Mary as the model of faith, discipleship, and mission, and seek to make Christ present in the world through communities of apostolic service.

A distinctive feature of Marianist life is the equal dignity of brothers and priests within the congregation. Members live in community and share a common mission, with emphasis on prayer, mutual support, and service. Traditional summaries of Marianist spirituality include:

- formation in faith;
- community life;
- mission in service;
- devotion to Mary;
- and adaptation to the needs of different cultures and times.

The congregation's motto, Servire Quam Sentire ("Serve with Feeling"), expresses its ideal of compassionate and generous service.

== Formation ==
Men entering the Society of Mary ordinarily pass through several stages of formation:

- Initial contact and discernment, often involving retreats and accompaniment by Marianist members;
- Aspirancy, a period of living in community and participating in ministry;
- Novitiate, a more intensive period of prayer, study, and discernment;
- Temporary vows, during which members profess the evangelical counsels and continue formation;
- Perpetual profession, by which they make lifelong commitment to the society.

Some professed members remain brothers, while others undertake priestly studies, including formation at the International Marianist Seminary in Rome.

== Organization and membership ==
As of 2020, the Society of Mary had approximately 930 members worldwide, including 309 priests. Its general administration is based in Rome.

The congregation is organized into provinces, regions, and districts. Its ministries include schools, universities, retreat centers, parishes, chaplaincies, and social-service works. Marianists frequently collaborate with lay partners in educational and pastoral apostolates.

== Activities by region ==
=== North America ===
==== Canada ====
The Marianists have been active in Canada in pastoral and educational work. One notable Canadian Marianist was Archbishop Raymond Roussin, S.M., who served as Archbishop of Vancouver from 2004 to 2009.

==== United States ====
The Marianists in the United States are organized principally into the Province of the United States and the Province of Meribah.

===== Province of Meribah =====
Established in 1976, the Province of Meribah works exclusively within the Roman Catholic Diocese of Rockville Centre on Long Island, New York. It operates several educational institutions, including Chaminade High School, Kellenberg Memorial High School, and St. Martin de Porres Marianist School. It also operates retreat houses, including Emmanuel Retreat House and Stella Maris Retreat House.

===== Province of the United States =====
The Province of the United States sponsors schools, retreat centers, parishes, and universities in several parts of the country, including Honolulu, St. Louis, Dayton, Cincinnati, San Antonio, and Omaha. Its three principal universities are the University of Dayton, St. Mary's University, Texas, and Chaminade University of Honolulu.

=== Europe ===
==== France ====
France, the birthplace of the society, remains an important center of Marianist life. The Province of France has also included communities in Belgium and Tunisia, as well as links with foundations in Africa. Its ministries have included schools, student residences, spiritual centers, chaplaincies, and youth work.

==== Italy ====
Rome is the site of the Marianists' general administration and international seminary. The general motherhouse is located at Via Latina 22.

==== Ireland ====
Since 1967, Marianists have operated St. Laurence College in Loughlinstown, Dún Laoghaire–Rathdown, at the invitation of Archbishop John Charles McQuaid. Their work in Ireland has also included school chaplaincy, prison ministry, youth ministry, drug rehabilitation, and parish work.

==== Spain ====
The Marianists have been present in Spain since 1887. They operate a number of schools, including Colegio del Pilar in Madrid. In 1977 they established the Santa Maria Foundation for publishing and educational initiatives.

==== Switzerland ====
In 1903, Fr. François Kieffer, S.M., founded the Villa St. Jean International School in Fribourg, which operated until 1970.

=== Latin America ===
==== Argentina ====
The Marianists arrived in Buenos Aires in 1932 and opened a school in the Caballito district in 1935. They later expanded to other cities including Junín, Nueve de Julio, and General Roca.

==== Chile ====
Marianists have worked in Chile since 1948. A Chilean province was established in 1982. Their institutions have included Colegio Santa María de la Cordillera, Colegio Parroquial San Miguel, Instituto Miguel León Prado, and Instituto Linares.

==== Peru ====
In Peru, the congregation operates several schools, among them Colegio Santa María Marianistas, Colegio María Reina Marianistas, Colegio San Antonio Marianistas, Colegio San José Obrero Marianistas, and Instituto Chaminade Marianistas.

==== Puerto Rico ====
Since 1938, the Marianists have operated Colegio San José in San Juan.

=== Africa ===
Marianists have been active in Africa since 1946, with missions and institutions in Kenya, Malawi, Zambia, the Republic of the Congo, the Democratic Republic of the Congo, Ivory Coast, Togo, and Tunisia.

==== Kenya ====
In Kenya the Marianists have operated schools and development projects, including Our Lady of Nazareth primary school, counseling and job-training programs in Nairobi, and work in Mombasa. They also founded Mang'u High School in 1925.

==== Malawi ====
In Malawi they have operated Chaminade Secondary School and MIRACLE, a rural job-training program serving young people affected by the AIDS crisis.

==== Zambia ====
In Zambia the Marianists have taught at Matero Boys Secondary School and have also assisted the local diocese through pastoral and liturgical ministry.

=== Asia and Oceania ===
==== Philippines ====
The Marianists established a community in Davao City in 2004. In 2005 they assumed responsibility for Balay Pasilungan, a program for street children accredited by the Philippine Department of Social Welfare and Development.

==== Japan ====
The Marianists entered Japan in 1887 and founded several educational institutions, including Gyosei Gakuen in Tokyo, Kaisei Gakuen in Nagasaki, Osaka Meisei Gakuen in Osaka, and St. Joseph School in Yokohama.

==== Australia ====
In Australia the Marianists have been associated with St Paul's College, Altona, established in 1969, and were involved in the foundation of John Paul College, Frankston, created in 1977 through a merger involving Stella Maris College.

== Educational institutions ==
The Society of Mary is particularly known for its educational apostolate. Marianist institutions include primary and secondary schools, universities, retreat centers, and formation houses. Among the best-known Marianist universities are:

- University of Dayton in Ohio, United States;
- St. Mary's University, Texas in San Antonio, United States;
- Chaminade University of Honolulu in Hawaii, United States.

Marianist education traditionally emphasizes the formation of the whole person and the integration of intellectual, moral, spiritual, and social development.

== Causes of canonization ==
=== Blesseds ===
- Guillaume-Joseph Chaminade (1761–1850), founder; beatified on 3 September 2000.
- Miguel Léibar Garay and three companions (died 1936), martyrs of the Spanish Civil War; beatified on 28 October 2007.
- Carlos Eraña Guruceta and two companions (died 1936), martyrs; beatified on 1 October 1995.
- Jakob Gapp (1897–1943), priest and martyr; beatified on 24 November 1996.

=== Venerables ===
- Domingo Lázaro Castro (1877–1935), priest.
- Faustino Pérez-Manglano Magro (1946–1963), postulant.
- Vicente López de Uralde Lazcano (1894–1990), priest.

=== Servants of God ===
- Raymond Halter (1925–1998), priest.

== See also ==
- Daughters of Mary Immaculate
- Marianist Family
- William Joseph Chaminade
