= Sisters of the Holy Family of Villefranche =

Religious institute

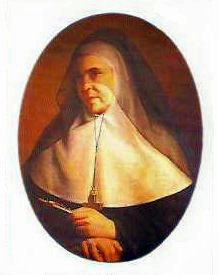
Saint Émilie de Rodat, founder of the Sisters of the Holy Family of Villefranche.

The Sisters of the Holy Family of Villefranche (French: Sœurs de la Sainte-Famille de Villefranche; Latin: Congregatio Sororum a Sacra Familia; abbreviation: S.F.), also called the Sisters of Villefranche, is a religious institute of pontifical right whose members profess public vows of chastity, poverty, and obedience and follow the evangelical way of life in common. The congregation was founded in 1815 by Émilie de Rodat in Villefranche-de-Rouergue, in southern France. Rodat established several schools and provided free education for girls, eventually expanding to other types of ministries, including visiting prisoners, caring for the ill and establishing hospitals, founding rescue homes for prostitutes, and establishing cloistered communities. By the time Rodat died in 1852, there were 38 houses, 25 cloistered communities, and 32 schools with over 5,000 students sponsored by the Sisters of the Holy Family of Villefranche in several countries. As of 1999, there were 520 Sisters of the Holy Family of Villefranche worldwide. In 2016, the congregation celebrated the bicentennial anniversary of its founding.

The Sisters of Villefranche are currently involved in evangelization, religious education, the education of children, working with young people and adults, nursing and the care of the elderly, working with "the poor and underprivileged", social work, spiritual direction and counseling, chaplaincy work in schools, hospitals, and prisons, parish ministry, and projects "for the advancement of women". They elect a General Council every five years, consisting of five nuns representing eight geographic areas. In 1993, they opened their ministries to the laity, forming groups in England, Brazil, the Ivory Coast, Spain, France, and Lebanon.

== History ==
The Sisters of the Holy Family of Villefranche was begun by Émilie de Rodat in 1815, in Villefranche-de-Rouergue, in southern France. Rodat looked for a community to join and was not able to find anything that suited her, but was inspired to begin her own community after overhearing a group of poor women discussing their regrets that unlike them, their daughters were unable to receive a religious education after the effects of the French Revolution. Rodat started a school in her small room at the school where she taught in Villefranche, starting with 40 students and three assistants. This was the beginning of what became the Sisters of the Holy Family of Villefranche, also called the Sisters of Villefranche.

On May 3, 1816, with the support of Rodat's spiritual director and mentor, the Abbé Marty, Rodat rented her own building, "a windy and poorly insulated tower house" in Villefranche, and started a free school for girls. Marty wrote a rule based upon the Rule of St. Augustine and "helped her to expand the focus of this new community". She purchased a building, and served 100 students and eight other sisters. Two years later, she was able to buy better buildings for her school, but the congregation's existence was threatened by a series of unexplained illnesses and deaths of the students and teachers that was attributed to "diabolic influence". but the community was established, anyway. Rodat and her nuns took perpetual vows in the autumn of 1820, and according to church historian and hagiographer Alban Butler, they adopted a habit "of which the distinguishing feature was the transparent edge of the veil covering the upper part of the face".

In 1822, the congregation took its final name and began to work outside Villefranche; in 1832, the Sisters of the Holy Family of Villefranche was formally approved by the bishop of Rodez. Founding schools were their main focus, but they gradually expanded to other ministries. In 1834, the congregation expanded to rural areas of France by opening a community in Aveyron in southern France. They began to visit prisoners in 1863, "with encouraging results", opened orphanages, rescue homes for prostitutes, and a retirement home for "aged religious". Rodat also founded groups of contemplative nuns to pray for the community's charitable works. At the time of her death in 1852, there were 38 houses, 25 cloistered communities, and 32 schools with over 5,000 students sponsored by the Sisters of the Holy Family of Villefranche in several countries.

Rome gave its approval of the Sisters of Villefrance in 1875. The congregation founded its first community in the Middle East in 1894, and its first community in Switzerland in 1901. In 1902, the community "reached its peak", with 199 communities and 1326 sisters. Many of the schools the Sisters of Villefranche founded were closed due to anti-congregational laws in France between 1902 and 1904, but they expanded internationally throughout the 20th century and into the 21st century, with communities in seven countries by 2016. In 1938, the Sisters founded a community in Rome. Rodat was beatified in 1940 and canonized in 1950. After 1969, the congregation founded small communities, in response to the Vatican's request and the needs in small and rural towns and cities. As of 1999, there were 520 Sisters of the Holy Family of Villefranche worldwide. In 2016, the congregation celebrated the bicentennial anniversary of its founding.

== Organization ==
The vocation of the Sisters of the Holy Family of Villefranche, inspired by Émilie de Rodat and the Holy Family, is to "live out the mystery of Nazareth in the reality of our world today". They define the mystery of Nazareth as the Incarnation of Christ, "seen in the life of Jesus who for thirty years at Nazareth lived an ordinary life in the company of Mary and Joseph". They believe that Christ, by growing up in a family without status, set an example for them to follow, living in community to "live the consecrated life of Poverty, Chastity and Obedience, and to strive together, in the world, to be witnesses of the love and communion between God and his people". They give priority, "in a world which is harsh towards the weak and the lowly", to the poor and disenfranchised. They are currently involved in evangelization, religious education, the education of children, working with young people and adults, nursing and the care of the elderly, working with "the poor and underprivileged", social work, spiritual direction and counseling, chaplaincy work in schools, hospitals, and prisons, parish ministry, and projects "for the advancement of women".

The Sisters of Villefranche is grouped into eight geographic sectors: France, the Ivory Coast-Senegal, Spain, England-Ireland, Lebanon, Bolivia, Brazil, and the Philippines. The congregation meets every five years in its general chapter conference, organized by its lay members, at its mother community in Villefranche. It selects five nuns to serve five-year terms on its General Council, made up of representatives of its communities. The last general chapter conference was held in 2017, when they elected the following members of its general council: Sister Leila Abou Rjeily (Lebanon), Superior General; Sister Brigitte Domergue (French in mission in the Philippines), Vicar General; Sister Ana Lopez Alvarez (Spanish in mission in Bolivia); Sister Juranice Dantas de Maria (Brazil); and Sister Mona Jabre (France and Lebanon).

Since 1993, the Sisters of Villefranche has opened its ministries to the laity, some of which publicly commit to following the example of its founder. The first international session of the "Lay Holy Family" occurred in 1998, and some of its lay members were invited to the general chapter conference in 2011. Groups of lay members of the congregation have been formed in England, Brazil, the Ivory Coast, Spain, France, and Lebanon. Lay members commit to daily personal prayer, regularly reading the scriptures and the writings of Rodat, Biblical formation, and "rereading one's life in the Light of the Gospel". Their mission is to "endeavour to live the Spirit of Nazareth by becoming actively engaged with the world with all its joys, complexities and injustices".
