= Marie Thérèse =

Marie Thérèse or Marie-Thérèse may refer to:

- Marie-Thérèse Abena Ondoa (born 1942), Cameroonian politician and minister
- Marie-Thérèse Armentero (born 1965), Swiss swimmer
- Marie-Thérèse Assiga Ahanda (1941–2014), Cameroonian novelist and chemist
- Marie-Thérèse Auffray (1912–1990), French artist
- Marie-Thérèse Bocoum, United Nations Independent Expert
- Marie Thérèse Françoise Boisselet (1731–1800), French Royal mistress
- Marie-Thérèse Bonnet (born 1955), French luger
- Marie-Thérèse Bourgeois Chouteau (1733–1814), American matriarch
- Marie-Thérèse Bourgoin (1781–1833), French actress
- Marie-Thérèse Bourquin (1916–2018), Belgian lawyer
- Marie-Thérèse Bruguière (born 1942), French politician
- Marie-Thérèse Chappaz, Swiss winemaker
- Marie-Thérèse Cheroutre (1924–2020), French historian
- Marie Thérèse Coincoin (1742–1816), American planter
- Marie-Thérèse Colimon-Hall (1918–1997), Haitian writer
- Marie-Therese Connolly, American lawyer
- Marie-Thérèse d'Alverny (1903–1991), French librarian and historian
- Marie-Thérèse Dancourt (1663–1725), French actress
- Marie-Thérèse de Chateauvieux (1915–2017), French politician
- Marie Thérèse de Choiseul (1766–1794), Princess Joseph of Monaco
- Marie-Thérèse de France (disambiguation)
- Marie-Thérèse Charlotte de Lamourous (1754–1836), Venerated French Catholic
- Marie-Thérèse de Noireterre (1760–1823), French artist
- Marie-Thérèse de Subligny (1666–1735), French ballerina
- Marie-Thérèse Eyquem (1913–1978), French politician
- Marie-Thérèse Figueur (1774–1861), French writer
- Marie Therese Forster (disambiguation)
- Marie-Thérèse Fortin (born 1959), Canadian actress
- Marie-Thérèse Gantenbein-Koullen (born 1938), Luxembourgian politician
- Marie-Thérèse Gauley (1903–1992), French opera singer
- Marie Thérèse Rodet Geoffrin (1699–1777), French hostess
- Marie-Thérèse Goutmann (1933–2016), French politician
- Marie-Therese Guyon Cadillac (1671–1746), wife of Antoine de la Mothe Cadillac
- Marie Thérèse Haze (1782–1876), Belgian Roman Catholic professed religious
- Marie Therese Henderson, Scottish music director and composer
- Marie-Thérèse Hermange (born 1947), French politician
- Marie-Thérèse Houphouët-Boigny (born 1930), First Lady of the Ivory Coast
- Marie-Thérèse Humbert (born 1940), Mauritian writer
- Marie-Thérèse Join-Lambert (1936–2023), French government official
- Marie-Thérèse Joniaux (1844–1923), Belgian serial killer
- Marie-Thérèse Julien Lung-Fou, sculptor and poet from Martinique
- Marie-Thérèse Kaiser (born 1996), German politician and model
- Marie-Thérèse Kerschbaumer (born 1936), Austrian writer
- Marie Thérèse Killens (born 1927), Liberal party member of the Canadian House of Commons
- Marie-Thérèse Laruette (1744–1837), French opera singer and playwright
- Marie-Thérèse Le Chêne (1890–?), French Special Operations Executive agent
- Marie-Thérèse Lefebvre (born 1942), Canadian musicologist and educator
- Marie-Thérèse Letablier (born 1947), French sociologist
- Marie-Thérèse Lucidor Corbin, French Creole activist
- Marie-Thérèse Maurette (1890–1989), French educator
- Marie Thérèse Mbaïlemdana, first woman mayor of N'Djamena
- Marie Thérèse Metoyer (1742–1816), planter of indigo and tobacco
- Marie-Thérèse Morlet (1913–2005), French scientist
- Marie Thérèse Mukamulisa (born 1965), Rwandan journalist
- Marie-Thérèse Naessens (born 1939), Belgian cyclist
- Marie-Therese Obst (born 1996), German-born Norwegian javelin thrower
- Marie Thérèse of Austria (1717–1780), Holy Roman Empress
- Marie Thérèse of Savoy (1756–1805), princess of Sardinia and of Piedmont
- Marie-Thérèse of Spain (disambiguation)
- Marie Thérèse Louise of Savoy, Princesse de Lamballe (1749-1792), Lady-in-Waiting to Marie Antoinette
- Marie Thérèse Péroux d'Abany (1753–1821), French writer
- Marie-Thérèse Reboul (1735–1806), French artist
- Marie-Thérèse Renard (1925–2012), Belgian sprinter
- Marie-Thérèse Sanchez-Schmid (born 1957), French politician
- Marie-Thérèse Schins (born 1943), German-Dutch painter, journalist and author
- Marie-Thérèse Toyi, member of the Pan-African Parliament
- Marie-Thérèse Walter (1909–1977), mistress of Pablo Picasso
- Marie-Therese Wolfram, Austrian mathematician

== See also ==
- Maria Theresa (disambiguation)
- Maria Theresia (disambiguation)
- Marie-Thérèse-Charlotte (disambiguation)
- Marie-Theres Nadig (born 1954), Swiss alpine skier
