= Dancourt =

Dancourt may refer to:

- Dancourt, Seine-Maritime, commune of the Seine-Maritime department, France
- Dancourt, former commune, now part of Dancourt-Popincourt, Somme department, France
- Ernest Grenet-Dancourt
- Florent Carton (Dancourt) (1661–1725), French dramatist and actor
- Louis Hurtaut Dancourt (1725–1801), French librettist, dramatist, and actor
- Manon Dancourt (1684–1740), stage name of the French actor born Marie-Anne-Armande Carton Dancourt
- Maurice Dancourt (fl. 1882), founder of L'Art culinaire
- Marie-Thérèse Dancourt (1663–1725), French actress

== See also ==
- Dampcourt
- Dampicourt
