= Marie-Thérèse-Charlotte (disambiguation) =

Marie-Thérèse-Charlotte was the eldest child of King Louis XVI of France.

Marie-Thérèse-Charlotte may also refer to:

- Lady Marie Therese Charlotte Bruce, wife of Maximilian, Prince of Hornes
- Marie-Thérèse Charlotte de Lamourous

== See also ==
- Marie-Thérèse (disambiguation)
