= Gabriel Bernard de Rieux =

Baron and lord of Livinière

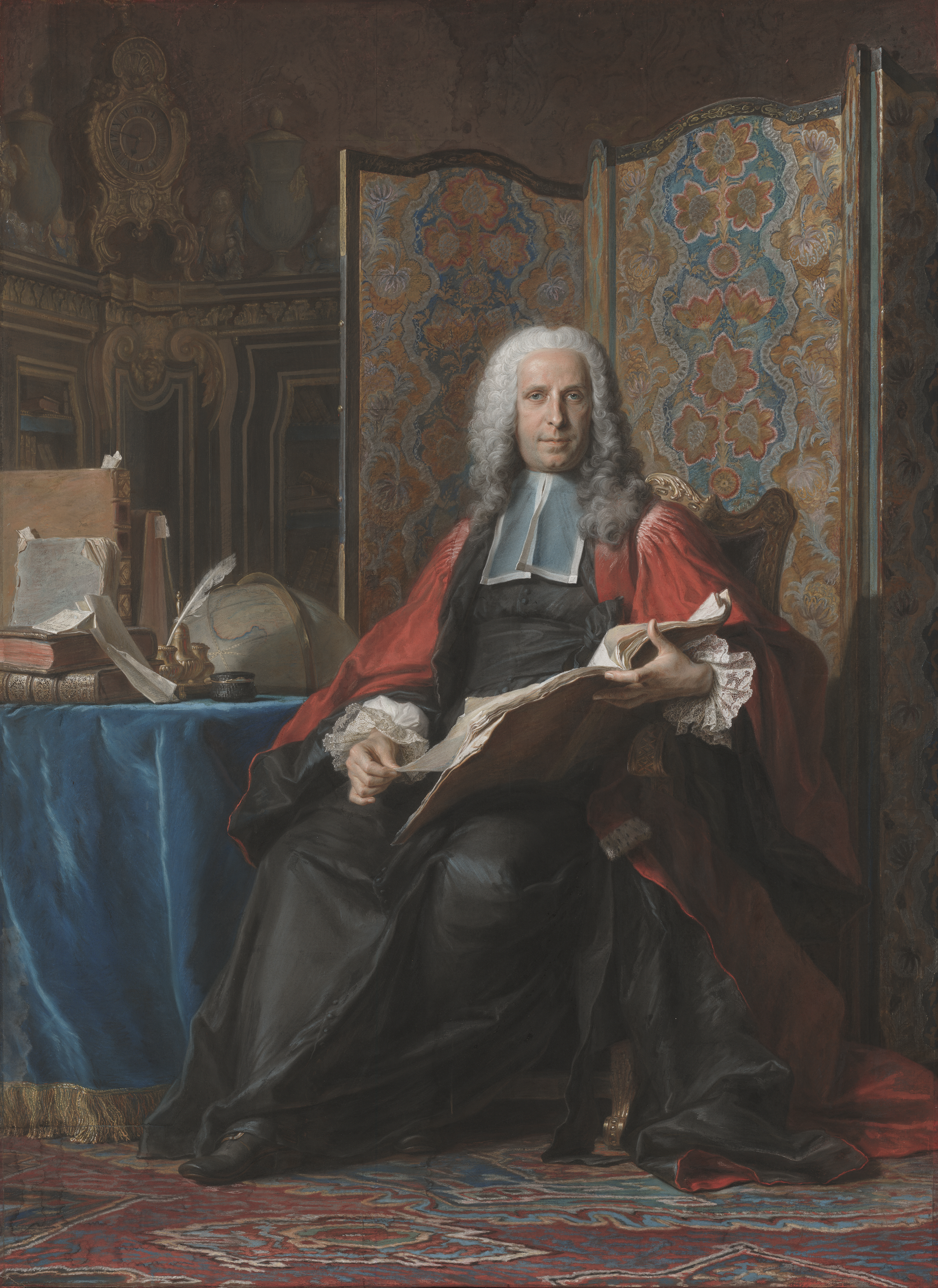
Portrait of Gabriel Bernard de Rieux by Maurice-Quentin de La Tour, exhibited at the Paris Salon and now in the Getty Center.

Gabriel Bernard, comte de Rieux (1687-13 December 1745), baron and lord of Livinière, was a member of the French parliament. He was known as président de Rieux.

== Life ==
Younger son of the famous financier Samuel Bernard and his first wife, Madeleine Clergeau, he began a career as a judge. He became substitute for the procurator general to the Parliament of Paris, counsellor to the same Parliament (from 31 August 1714), president of the Second Chamber of Enquiries to that Parliament, president of the Chambre des comptes (from 7 January 1727). He died in office.

When his father died in 1739 he inherited his hôtel particulier on rue Notre Dame des Victoires in Paris, along with the estate and lordship of Glisolles He bought the château de Passy from Manon Dancourt on 18 March 1739 and lived there until his death, continuing his father's tradition of hospitality. He founded a boys' school and a girls' school in his lordship of Passy. He bore the title of count of Rieux, an estate his father had received in payment of a debt.

== Family portraits ==
In 1738 he commissioned a pastel from Maurice-Quentin de La Tour of his niece Marie Louise Gabrielle de La Fontaine Solare, who in 1743 became marquise de Sesmaisons. This measured 0,53 m by 0,61 m and was exhibited at the 1738 Salon. It was owned by de Rieux's descendents until 1918 and entered the Louvre collection in 2014.

In 1739, he commissioned a portrait of himself from the same artist, who produced it as a large format (2,00 m. x 1,50 m.) pastel showing him seated in the costume of the President of the Parliament of Paris. The finished work was exhibited at the Paris Salon in 1741 and is considered as one of the artist's masterpieces.

de La Tour also produced a smaller (1,16 x 0,90 m.) portrait of de Rieux's wife in a ballgown holding a mask, exhibited at the 1742 Salon and now in the musée Cognacq-Jay.

== Marriages and issue ==
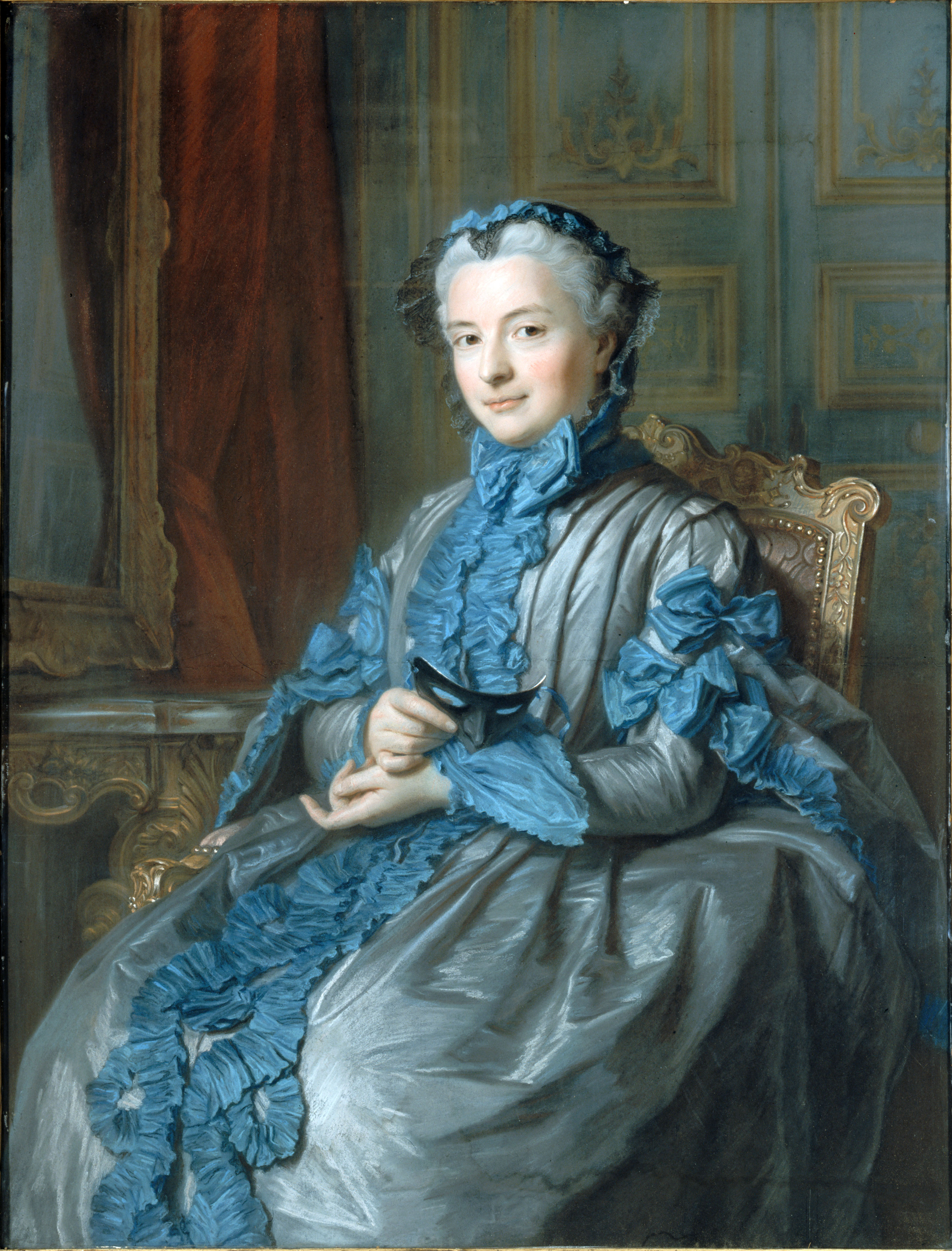
De La Tour's portrait of de Rieux's second wife (musée Cognacq-Jay).

In 1717 he married Bonne de Saint-Chamans, daughter of François de Saint Chamans, marquis of Mery, and his wife Bonne de Chastellux. After her death he married Suzanne Marie Henriette de Boulainvilliers (1696-1776) on 29 May 1719 in the chapel of the château de Grosbois, her brother's residence. Suzanne was a daughter of Henri, comte de Boulainvilliers and his first wife Marie Anne Henriette Hurault du Marais. de Rieux and de Boulainvilliers had two children:

- Anne Gabrielle Henriette Bernard de Rieux (1721-1736), in 1733 married Charles Pierre Gaston de Lévis, marquess then duke of Mirepoix, marshal of France (1699-1757), no issue ;
- Gabriel-Henri Bernard de Rieux, in 1766 made marquis de Boulainvilliers (1724-1798), counsellor to the Parliament of Paris (1744), then president of the second chamber of enquiries at that Parliament (1749), provost and master of ceremonies to the Order of Saint Louis, governor of the Ile de France (1775). Like his father and grandfather, he married twice - in 1746 to Marie-Madeleine de Grimoard du Roure and in 1748 to Marie Madeleine Adrienne d'Hallencourt de Boulainvilliers (1729-1781). Leurs portraits furent peints par Louis-Michel van Loo By this second marriage he had two sons (who died in infancy) and three daughters:
  - Bonne Marie Gabrielle Joséphine Bernard de Boulainvilliers (1752-1829) (portrait by Élisabeth Vigée Le Brun, now in the musée des Augustins de Toulouse) in 1770 married Emmanuel-Henri-Charles de Crussol, marquis of Florensac, lieutenant général in the royal army, deputy for the nobility to the bailliage of Bar-sur-Aube at the Estates General of 1789, émigré, knight in the orders of Saint Louis, Notre-Dame du Mont-Carmel and Saint-Lazare de Jérusalem (1741-1818), no issue;
  - Adrienne Marie Gabrielle Bernard de Boulainvilliers, in 1773 married Léonor, viscount of Faudoas, mestre de camp, knight of the order of Saint-Louis (1737-1804), with issue;
  - Anne Marie Louise Bernard de Boulainvilliers (1758-1781), in 1779 married Gaspard Paulin, 4e duc de Clermont-Tonnerre (1750-1842), with issue

== Bibliography (in French) ==
- E. de Clermont-Tonnerre, Histoire de Samuel Bernard et de ses enfants, 1914, Paris, Librairie ancienne Honoré Champion, XII+418 pp., p. 155-177.
- Catalogue for the sale of his library (1747), totalling 3314 books
