= Marie-Thérèse Lefebvre =

Canadian musicologist and educator

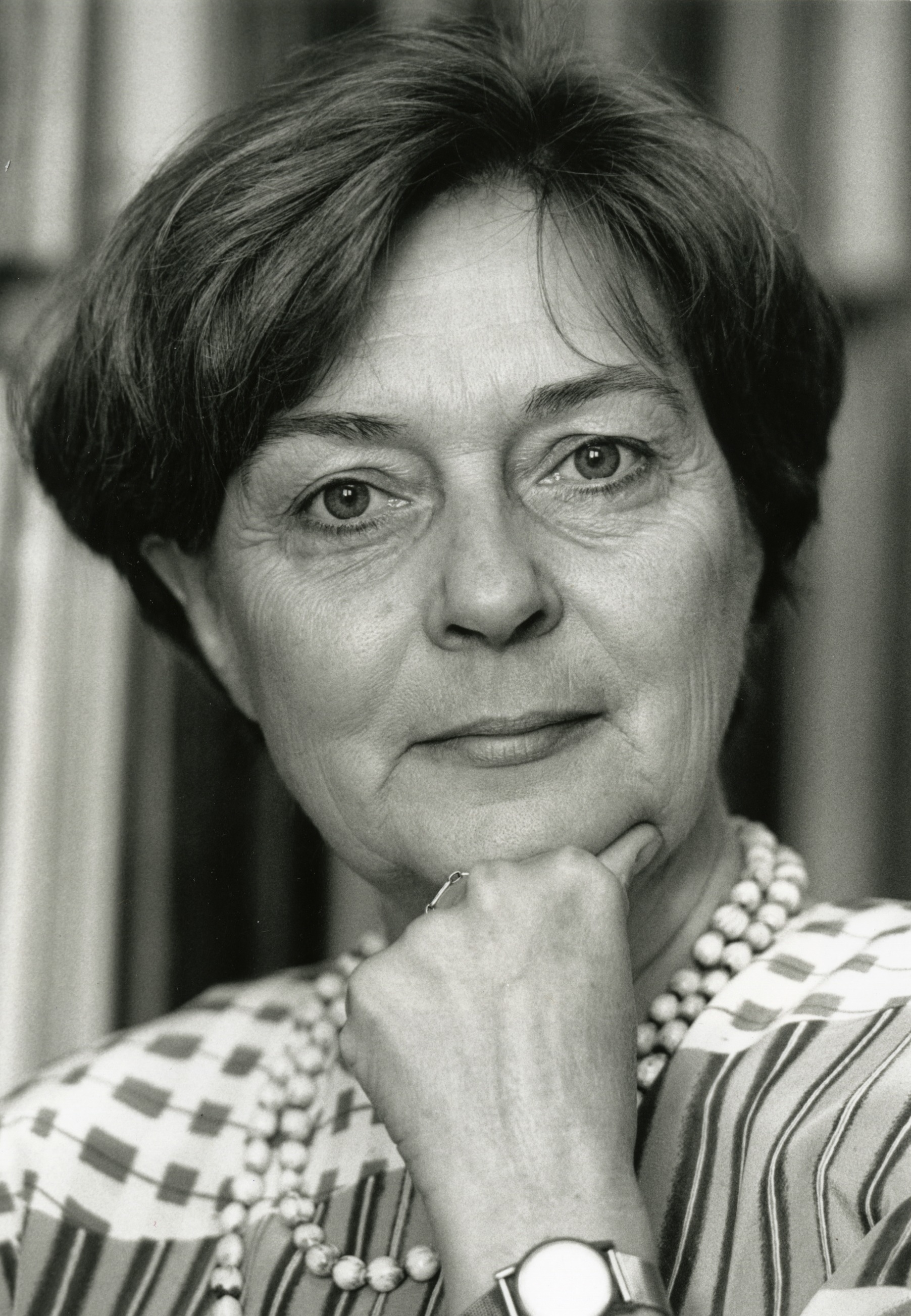
- Born: May 16, 1942 (age 84); Montreal, Quebec

Marie-Thérèse Lefebvre (born May 16, 1942) is a Canadian musicologist and educator living in Quebec.

== Biography ==
She was born in Montreal and received a BA from the Collège Basile-Moreau there. She also earned a diploma in piano. From 1963 to 1968, she was a reference librarian at the Université de Montréal and from 1968 to 1970 performed the same function for the department of social medicine at the Université de Sherbrooke. From 1971 to 1974, she attended the École de musique Vincent-d'Indy and continued her studies at the Université de Montréal, receiving a doctorate in musicology. From 1981 to 2010, she was a professor at the Université de Montréal; from 1993 to 1998 she was dean of graduate studies there and was acting dean from 1997 to 1998. Her primary area of research was the history of music in Quebec.

From 1986 to 1988, she was and advisor to the Minister of State for Culture of the Gabonese Republic; she also taught at Omar Bongo University in that country. From 1983 to 1985, she was president of the Association pour l’avancement de la recherche en musique québécoise (later the Société québécoise de recherche en musique).

She has contributed to the Encyclopedia of Music in Canada and published several books: including biographies of Serge Garant, Jean Vallerand, Gilles Potvin, Maryvonne Kendergi, Adrienne Roy-Vilandré, Auguste Descarries and Gilles Tremblay.

== Awards and honours ==
Lefebvre is a four-time winner of the Opus Prize for Book of the Year awarded by the Conseil québécois de la musique. She received the MusCan Award of Excellence from the SOCAN Foundation. In 2009, she received the Helmut Kallmann Award for Distinguished Service.
