= Manon Dancourt =

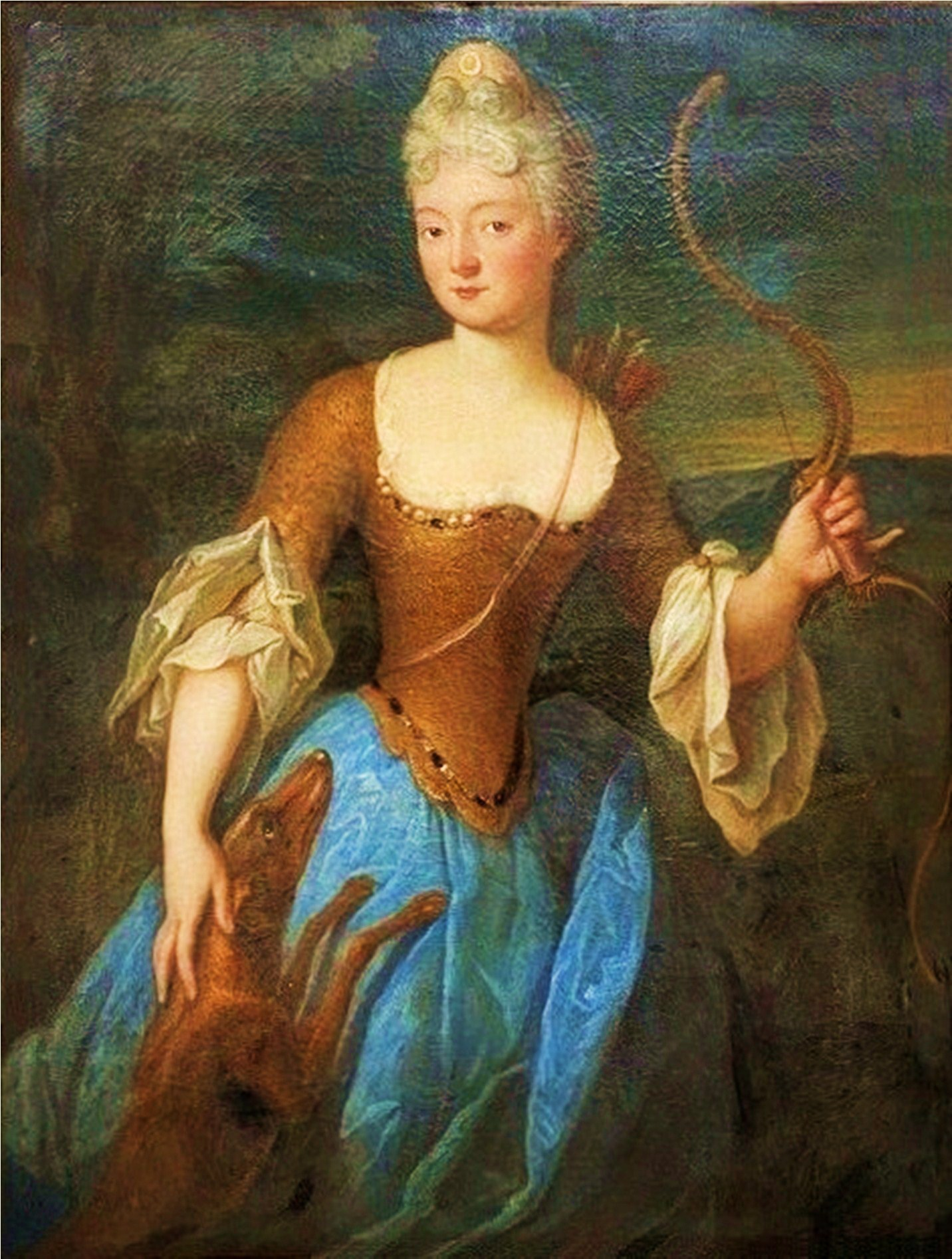
Manon Dancourt as Diana the huntress, c.1720 (anonymous, private collection, formerly in the collections of the château de Passy and the château de Chenonceau).

Manon Dancourt (1684 – 13 February 1740) was the stage name of a French actor born Marie-Anne-Armande Carton Dancourt.

== Life ==
She was born in Paris as eldest child of actors Florent Carton and Marie-Thérèse Le Noir de La Thorillière. She first appeared onstage aged eleven in 1695 and played further child roles. She was received into the Comédie-Française on 13 January 1699 aged fifteen. Attractive but with limited talent, she abandoned theatre in 1702. Her younger sister, Mimi Dancourt, was luckier and a more talented actor.

After her marriage she and her husband de Fontaine initially settled in Dunkerque due to his job, but she soon returned to Paris. and set up a salon.

Manon Dancourt was also financier Samuel Bernard's mistress. The liaison may have begun before her marriage, but there is no certainty about when it began. Her husband was more often in the naval ports he was inspecting than in Paris. Bernard used his influence to get de Fontaine promoted higher and higher in the naval ministry and perhaps thus won his favour.

Bernard recognised the three illegitimate children he had with Dancourt, all born in Paris:

1. Louise-Marie-Madeleine (28 October 1706-20 November 1799). Married fermier général Claude Dupin on 1 December 1722 at Saint-Roch church in Paris. They owned the hôtel Lambert, the château de Chenonceau and the marquisate of Le Blanc.
2. Marie-Anne-Louise (25 August 1710 - 3 March 1765). On 16 October 1724 at the église Notre-Dame-de-Grâce-de-Passy married Antoine Alexis Panneau d'Arty, director-general for assistance from 1737 to 1743. She also had a relationship with the prince de Conti from 1737 onwards. Her will and codicil were deposited at the office of Parisian notary Maître Frédéric Henri Mareschal on the day of her death.
3. Françoise-Thérèse (12 March 1712 - 21 April 1765 (Note: Her death registration has been reconstructed at the Archives de Paris)). On 12 May 1729 married Nicolas Vallet, lord of La Touche, in Passy, but in 1736 she fled to join her lover Evelyn Pierrepont, 2nd Duke of Kingston-upon-Hull. She was buried on 22 April 1765 at église Saint-Eustache.

In Book 7 of his Confessions, Jean-Jacques Rousseau wrote that "they were three sisters who could be called the Three Graces".

Armande Dancourt became "lady of the lordship of Passy" on 30 April 1722 by acquiring the château de Passy from Jacques-Daniel de Gueutteville, lord of Orsigny She never had usufruct for the château but was instead its legitimate owner. By that purchase she became "Lady of the estate and lordship of Passy" and not Bernard, who never inherited that title despite financing Dancourt's purchase and her works on the château and estate. After Bernard's death she sold the château on 18 March 1739 to Gabriel Bernard, comte de Rieux, Bernard's younger son - the sales agreement stipulated that she was living on rue du Luxembourg, in Saint-Roch parish in Paris.

Her parents died in 1725 and on 6 July 1726 she renounced an inheritance from them. Dancourt's health deteriorated and on 6 October 1739 she wrote down her last wishes. In 1740 she died of cancer in her home in Paris. Her will was deposited on the day of her death with her notary, who also carried out the inventory of her goods on 23 February 1740.

== Marriage and issue ==
On 4 November 1702, at Saint-Sulpice in Paris, she married Jean-Louis-Guillaume de Fontaine (1666-1714). He was commissioner and controller for the Navy and Army in the Flandres and Picardie department. They had two children:

1. Jeanne-Marie-Thérèse in 1703. (Note: The historian Gustave Desnoiresterres has found no trace of her birth registration in Paris's parish registers before they disappeared in 1871.) She married François II de Barbançois, lord of Celon in the Berry on 21 August 1720. They had one child, François-Armand de Barbançois on 17 September 1723 at the lordly château of Passy, who was baptised the same day at église Notre-Dame-de-Grâce-de-Passy, though the mother died in childbirth.
2. Jules-Armand (3 April 1709, Saint-Roch parish in Paris - 4 March 1758). He became commissioner for war for the towns, citadels and forts of Metz, Toul, Verdun, Montmédy and Longwy on 18 January 1737 then fermier général.He married Louise Liégault de l'Isle de Châteauneuf, and they jointly owned the château du Coq in Auteuil, though they died without issue.
