= Marie Thérèse of France (disambiguation) =

Marie Thérèse of France (1778–1851) was the eldest child of King Louis XVI and Queen Marie Antoinette of France.

Marie Thérèse of France may also refer to:

- Marie Thérèse, Madame Royale (1667–1672), daughter of King Louis XIV
- Marie Thérèse Félicité of France (1736–1744), daughter of King Louis XV
- Princess Marie Thérèse of France (1746–1748), first child of Louis, Dauphin of France

== See also ==
- Maria Teresa Rafaela of Spain (1726–1746), Dauphine of France
