= Marie Thérèse Mbaïlemdana =

First woman mayor of N'Djamena

- Citizenship: Chad
- Occupation: Politician
- Known for: the first woman mayor of the metropolitan city of N'Djamena.

Marie Thérèse Mbaïlemdana is a Chadian politician who served as the first woman mayor of the metropolitan city of N'Djamena.

Her term in office was characterized by corruption allegations. On 3 August 2011, Mbaïlemdana and two of her officials - the director of finance affairs and the municipal collector - were arrested by the police and taken to the N'Djamena remand center following their indictment of misappropriation of public funds and property to the tune of 1.2 billion CFA franc. She was held in detention for three months before being released on health grounds in October 2011.
