= Marie-Thérèse Julien Lung-Fou =

Sculptor and poet from Martinique

- Born: May 11, 1909; Les Trois-Îlets
- Died: January 24, 1981 (aged 71)
- Education: Beaux-Arts de Paris
- Occupations: Sculptor, Designer, Painter and Poet
- Honours: Ordre des Palmes académiques Ordre National du Mérite

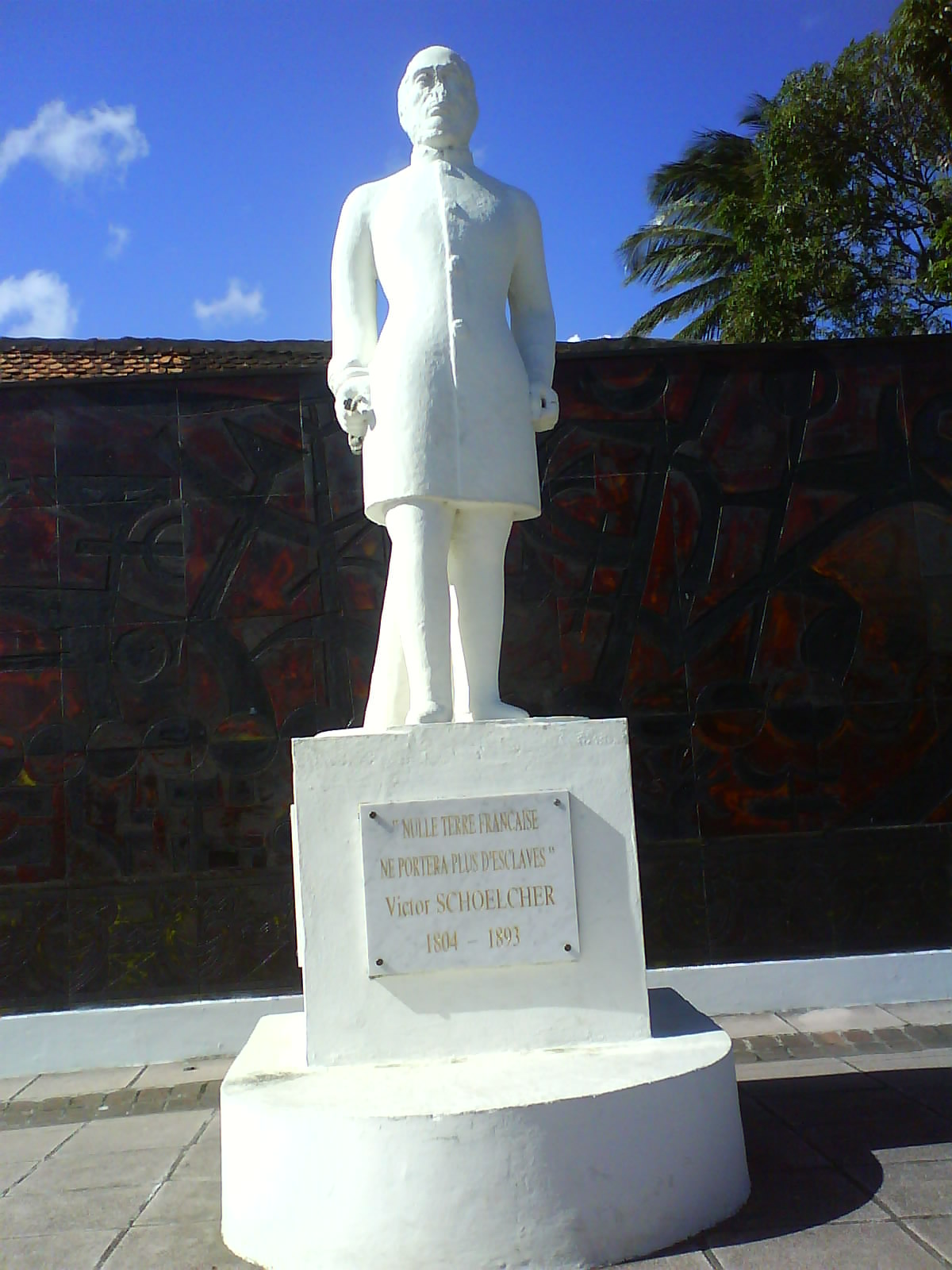
Julien Lung-Fou's statue of Victor Schoelcher in the town of Schoelcher, (destroyed).

Marie-Thérèse Julien Lung-Fou (11 May 1909-24 January 1981) was the first female sculptor in Martinique, an island in the French West Indies. She was also a storyteller, poet, and painter. She was known for her visual expression of her multiethnic background, possessing Afro-Caribbean, Chinese, and European heritage.

== Biography ==
Born in the region of Les Trois-Îlets, a town and commune on the island of Martinique, Lung-Fou received her artistic education at the Ecole des Beaux-Arts in Paris. In 1938, she received a bronze medal at the Paris International Exposition of the Salon of the Society of French Artists for her work L’Offrande (The Offering) in the Art Deco style. She married her husband Julien at that time, taking the name Lung-Fou to honor her two grandfathers, one born in Dieppe, the other in Canton, and her mixed-race Martinican grandmothers.

Lung-Fou traveled throughout the French colonial empire, learning about the various cultures and ethnicities throughout the territories. She was involved with the Société Coloniale des Artistes Français (SCAF), but as a woman she was only permitted on the fringes, limiting her ability to further her career and gain recognition. She spent ten years in French Indochina with her husband before returning to Martinique by 1945. There she resumed her diverse artistic pursuits, including sculpture, poetry, and performance. She participated in and wrote about Martinican Carnival, which often involved cross-dressing as part of the celebrations. In Fort-de-France, Lung-Fou was able to establish herself as an artist, using her studio to teach young women various visual arts in addition to taking commissions.

As a prominent artist in the Martinican community, Lung-Fou was well-respected and prolific. Her works were featured in various public and private spheres of Martinican society, including a statue of Saint Dominic for the town of Morne-Rouge.

Lung-Fou was Martinique's first author of Chinese origin, making a name for herself in Creole theatre, with stories and poems also in Creole. In 1969, she published a play entitled Trois Bonnes Fortunes, showing a playful sense of humour in three social satires, followed in 1973 by Fables créoles transposées et illustrées. This book translates La Fontaine's French tales into Creole, with illustrations by the author.

Lung-Fou died on January 24, 1981 at the age of 71.

== Themes ==
Lung-Fou came from a diverse background; in addition to her Afro-Caribbean Martinican heritage, she also possessed Chinese and Breton ancestry. She sought to demonstrate her mixed background through her work. As a result, her art encompassed various subjects and styles. Her wide range of talents included sculpture, painting, drawing, poetry, theatre, storytelling and children’s literature. While the focus of each work was different, she repeatedly aimed to incorporate various aspects of her identity. She defended Afro-Caribbean heritage and encouraged multiculturalism among all peoples.

== Legacy ==
During an event in 2018 to mark the naming of a library in Les Trois-Îlets in her honour, the author, Raphaël Confiant spoke of Lung-Fou as a precursor of Creolité, a person who accepted multiple identities as her own. She is also known as a collector and writer of créole tales who worked to preserve and maintain creole culture, in Carnival, in her own conduct and through storytelling.

In its page about the dedication, the town's site quotes Julien Lung-Fou speaking about her interest in tales:

"The love of my country has led me to study our popular traditions. To all those who may not have known the wonderful time when the das used to lull our childhood with the stories of Compè Lapin, Ti-Jean, Gens-Gros-Mône, I offer collections, stories, proverbs, riddles (or titimes) as they were told to me, in which all the spirit, all the faux naive mischief of the Creole people, shines through.

— Marie-Thérèse Julien Lung-Fou

Her writing is used to teach Martinican Creole; it is a part of the literary history of the language as well as an inspiration to contemporary writers.

However, some of Lung-Fou's works have also attracted controversy, particularly her 1964 sculpture of abolitionist Victor Schoelcher. Critics accused the statue, alongside other works depicting Schoelcher, of perpetuating a narrative of passivity by Martinique's enslaved population. In 2013, Lung-Fou's statue was vandalized, being branded with pro-independence slogans while having its face destroyed.

== Works ==
=== Books ===
1956 Dialogue. Revue culturelle chez Madame Julien Lung-Fou.

1950s Les recettes de cuisine martiniquaise de Da Elodie

1958 Fables créoles

1973 Fables créoles transposées et illustrées

1979 Le carnaval aux antilles

1980 La santé de maman et bébé par les plantes (in collaboration with Renée Beuze)

1977 A preface for René Bonneville's (1871-1902) La Vierge cubaine

1980 Contes créoles

1980 Contes diaboliques

1980 Contes animaux, proverbes, titimes ou devinettes

Nouvelles fables créoles

=== Theatre ===
1969 3 bonnes fortunes : trois comédies en un acte ; three comedies of manners written with Albert Adréa: Le crucifix, Le Saint Joseph and Pauvres pisseuses.

=== Poetry ===
1958 Musique noire : (poèmes)

1976 Les piments doux : 25 fantaisies de

== See also ==
Marie-Thérèse Julien Lung-Fou: A biography written as part of the Archives of Women Artists, Research and Exhibitions “The Origin of Others” research programme, in partnership with the Clark Art Institute.
