= Notre-Dame-de-Grace de Passy =

Church in Paris, France

Coordinates: 48.8564°N 2.2801°E

Notre-Dame-de-Grace de Passy, Paris
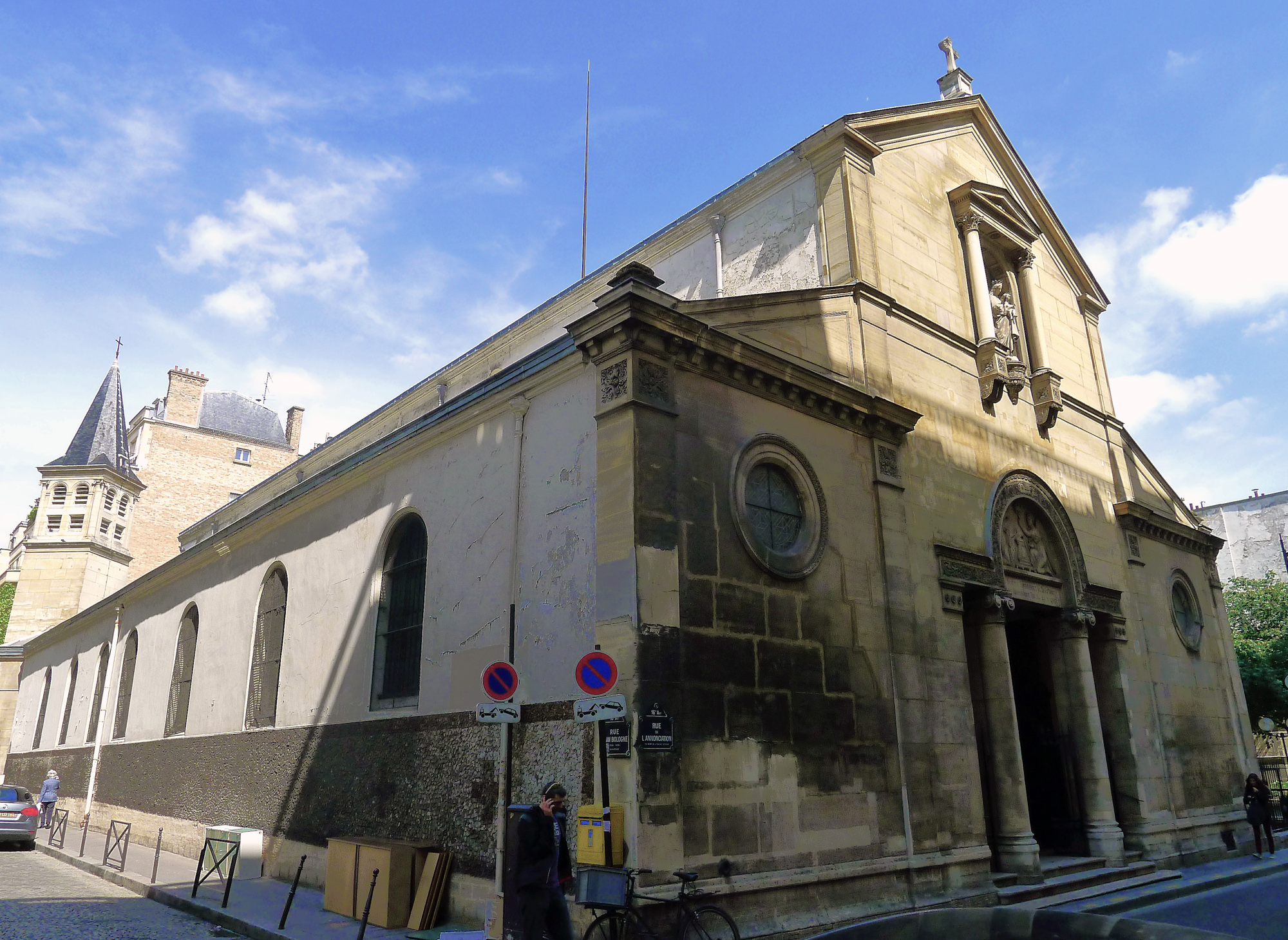
- Notre-Dame-de-Grace-de-Passy, Paris

Religion
- Affiliation: Catholic Church
- Province: Archdiocese of Paris
- Rite: Roman Rite

Location
- Location: 194 Rue Raimond-Losserand, 16th arrondissement of Paris
- Interactive map of Notre-Dame-de-Grace de Passy, Paris

Architecture
- Style: Neo-Roman, Neo-Byzantine
- Groundbreaking: 1672
- Completed: 1961

Notre-Dame-de-Grace de Passy is a Roman Catholic Church located at 10 Rue de l'Annunciation in the 16th arrondissement of Paris. The old church was built in 1672 and rebuilt on a larger scale in the 1850s. The exterior and nave are very austere and modern, while the walls of the choir are entirely covered with murals.

== History ==
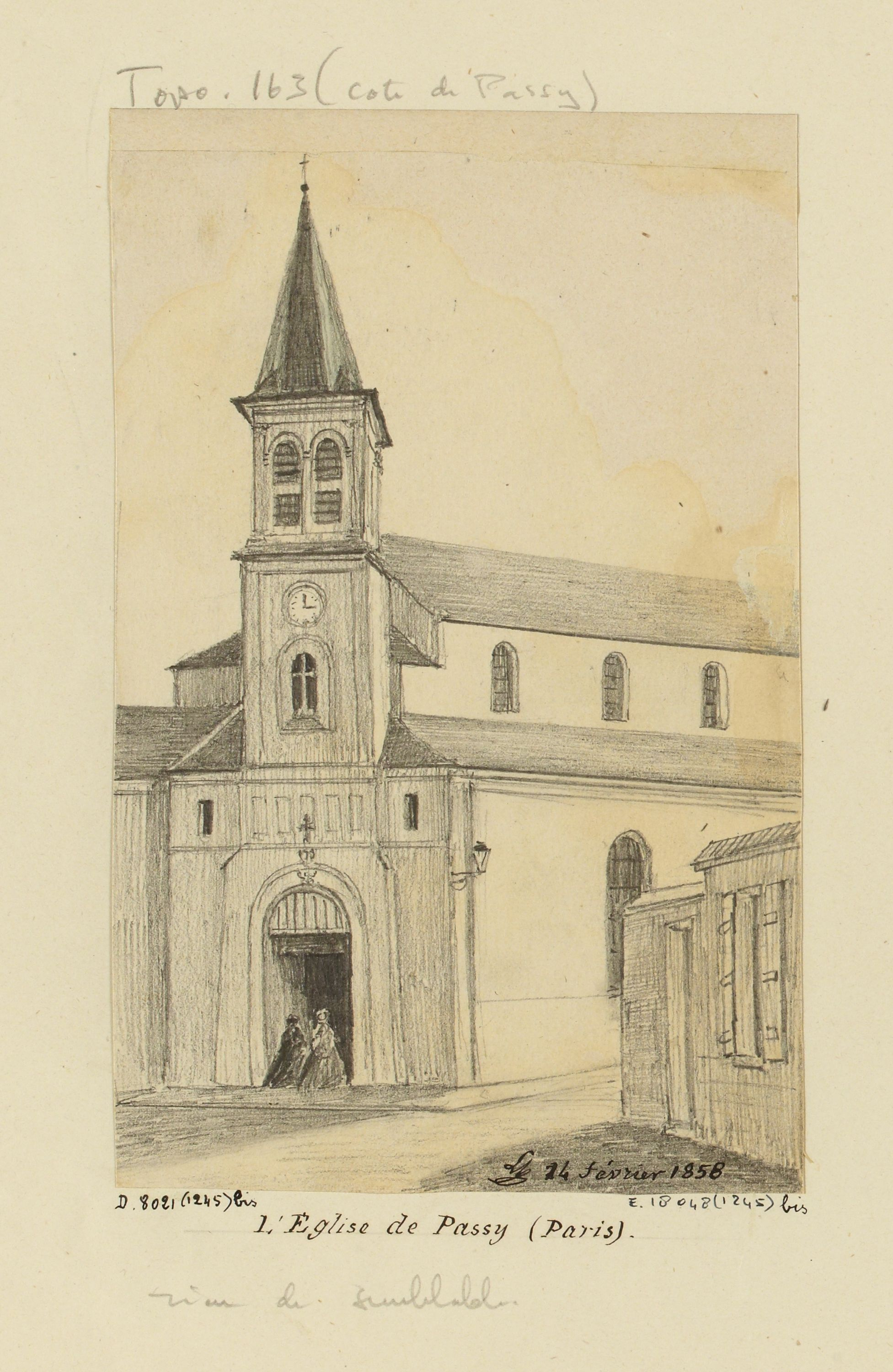
The church in 1858

The first chapel was constructed by Claude Chahu, the lord of Passy, with his own funds. In 1672, after his death, his widow, Christine de Heurles, persuaded the church authorities to create a new parish for the church. She donated 19,800 French livres for enlargements to the church and for a school. She died in 1683. Her portrait is found in the sacristy of the church.

The early church consisted only of a single nave and a lateral chapel devoted to the Virgin Mary. As the population of the parish grew, a larger church was needed. A new structure was built by architect Eugene Debressenne (1813–1893), with the first section in from 1846 until 1849, and the second section from 1856 to 1859. A bell tower was constructed in 1846, to house a bell made in 1763. Of the original church, only the pillars of the nave were preserved.

The chapels of the Sacred Heart and the Virgin were added in the 1850s, and the sacristy was enlarged in 1872. With further additions in the 1890s, the church was able to welcome six hundred persons. The church underwent further major renovations in the late 1990s, reopening in Christmas 1996.

The Impressionist painter Berthe Morisot was married to Eugène Manet, brother of Édouard Manet, in the church on December 22, 1874.

The marriage of Brigitte Bardot and Roger Vadim took place in the church on 20 December 1952, three months after her eighteenth birthday. The marriage lasted four years.

== Exterior ==
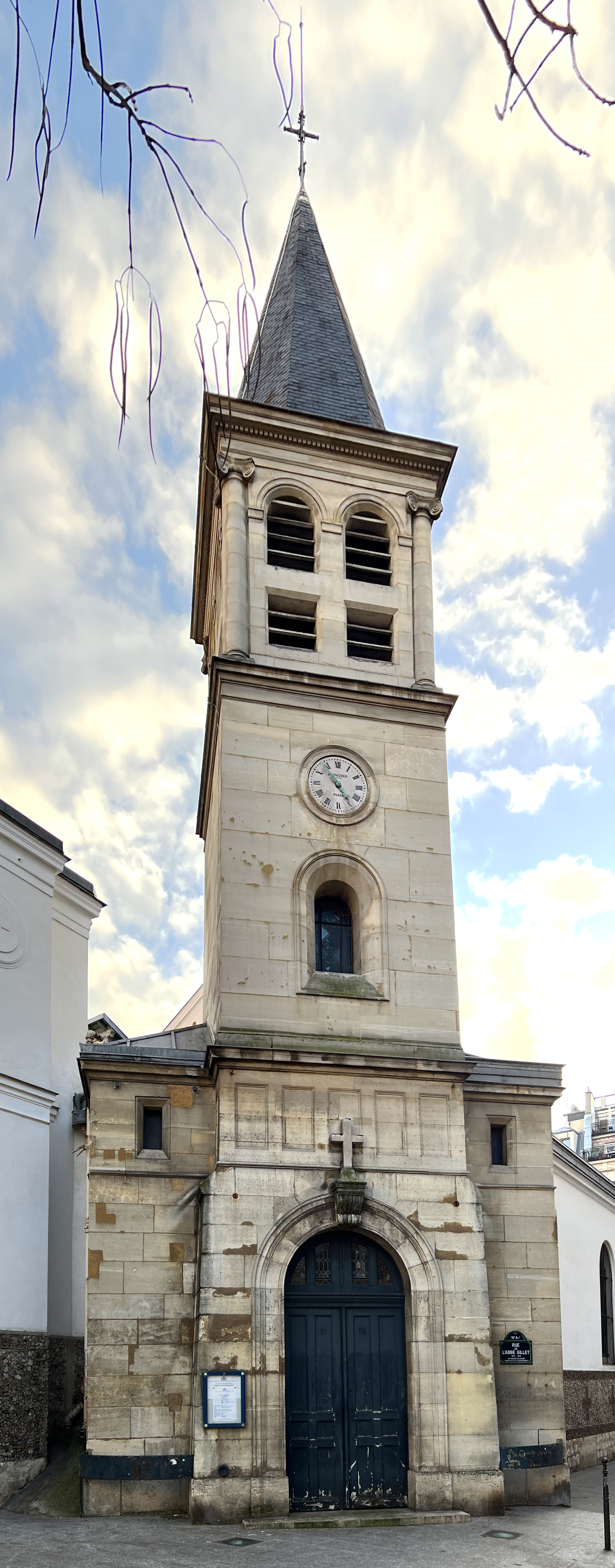
Tower (1846)

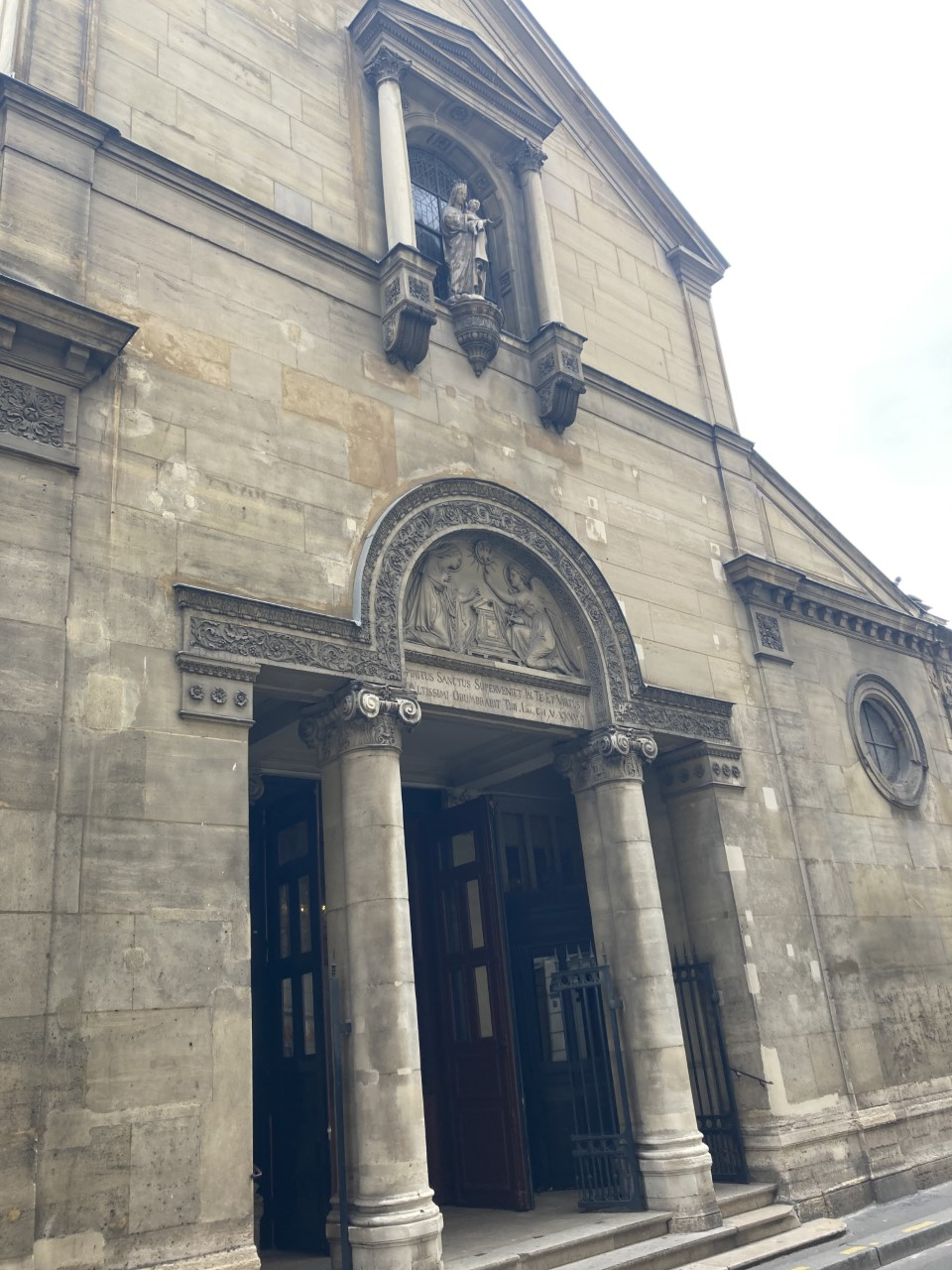
Facade of the old church, with sculpture above of Christ and the Virgin Mary

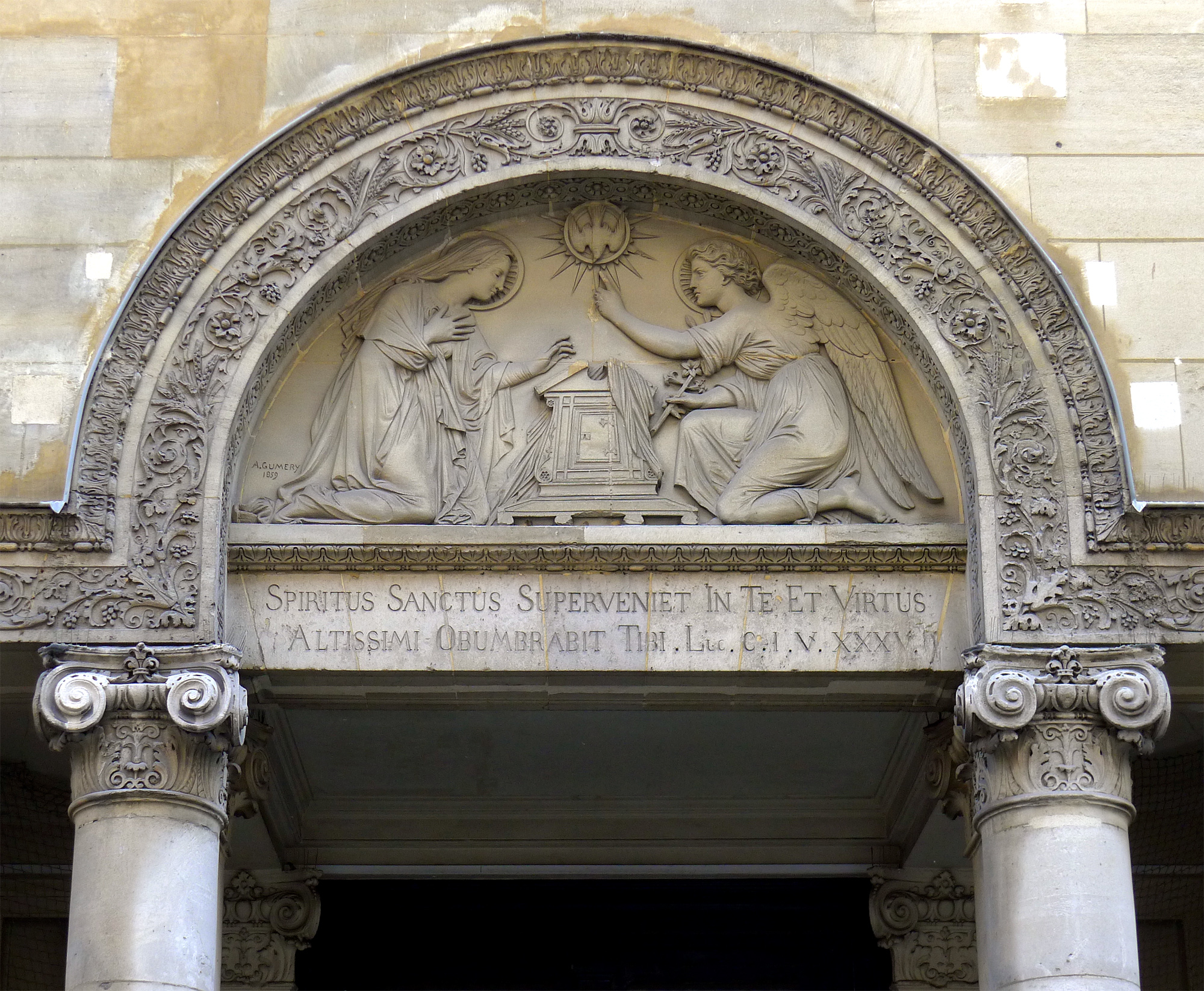
Detail of the tympanum over the portal

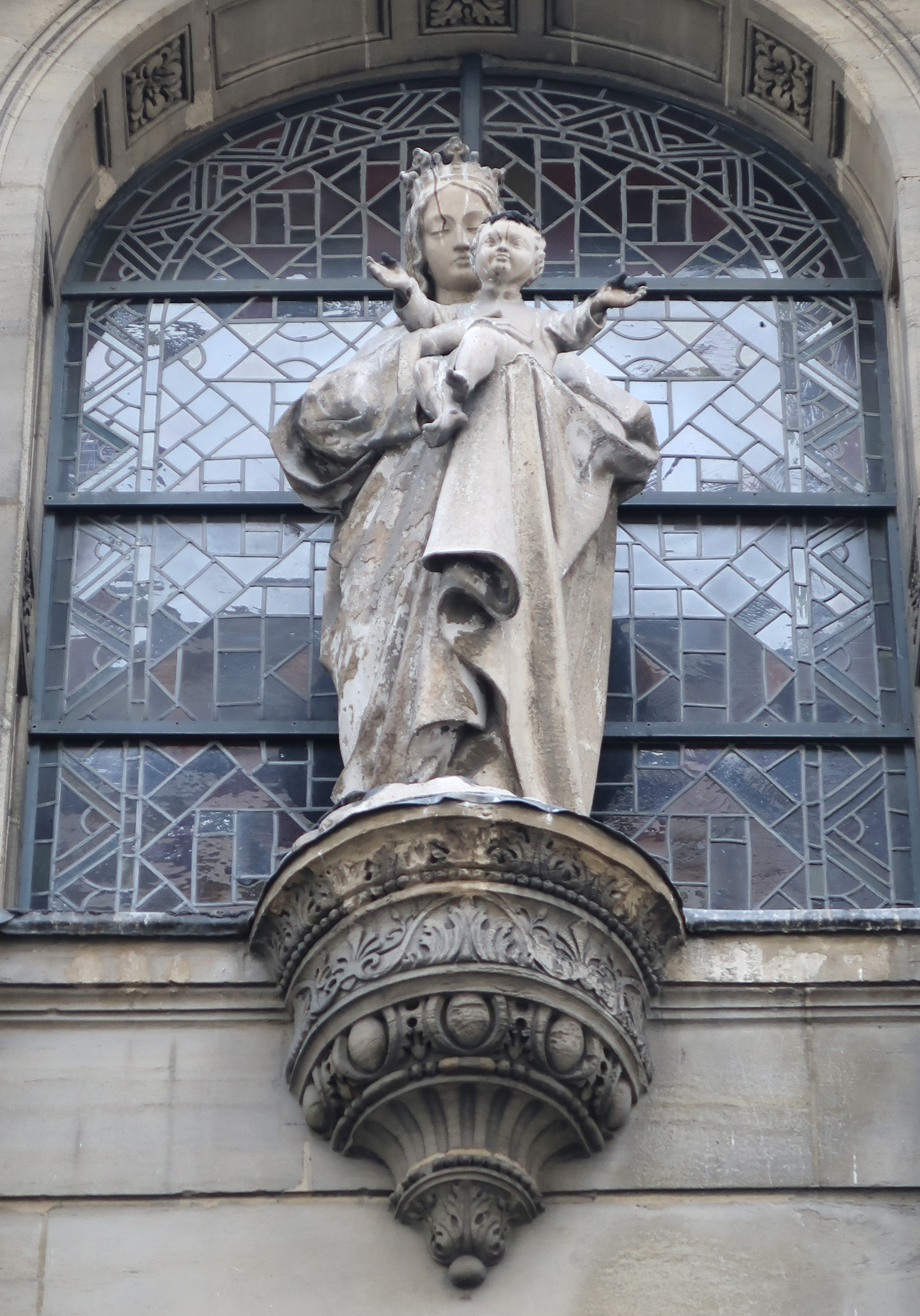
Virgin and Child over the portal

The exterior of the church dates to the 1840s–1860s. The tympanum of the church portal on Rue de l'Annonciation is decorated with a bas-relief depiction of the Annunciation, made by sculptor Charles Gumery (1827–1871). Above it is a sculpture of the Virgin Mary and Child.

== Interior ==
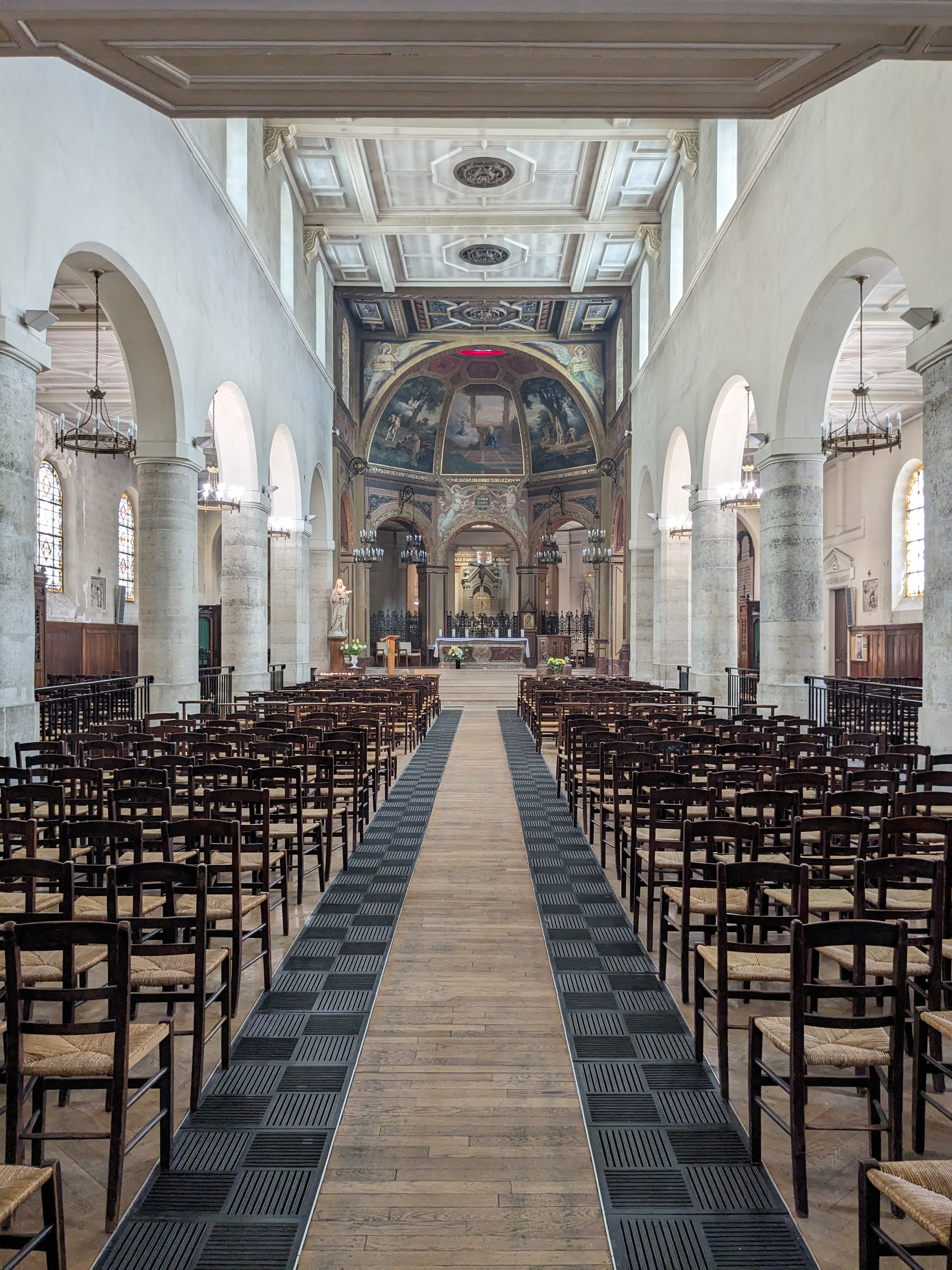
The choir seen from the nave

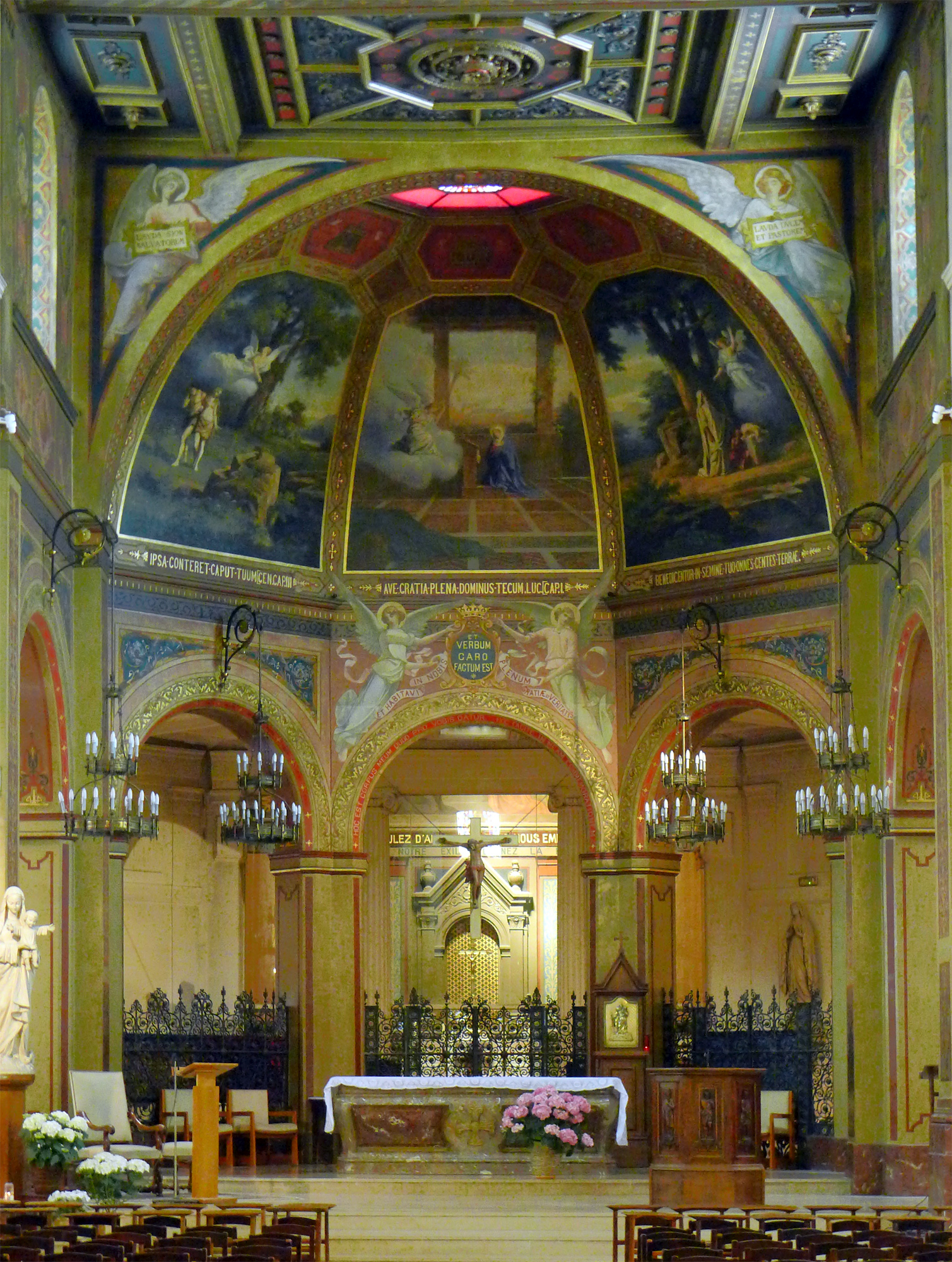
The choir

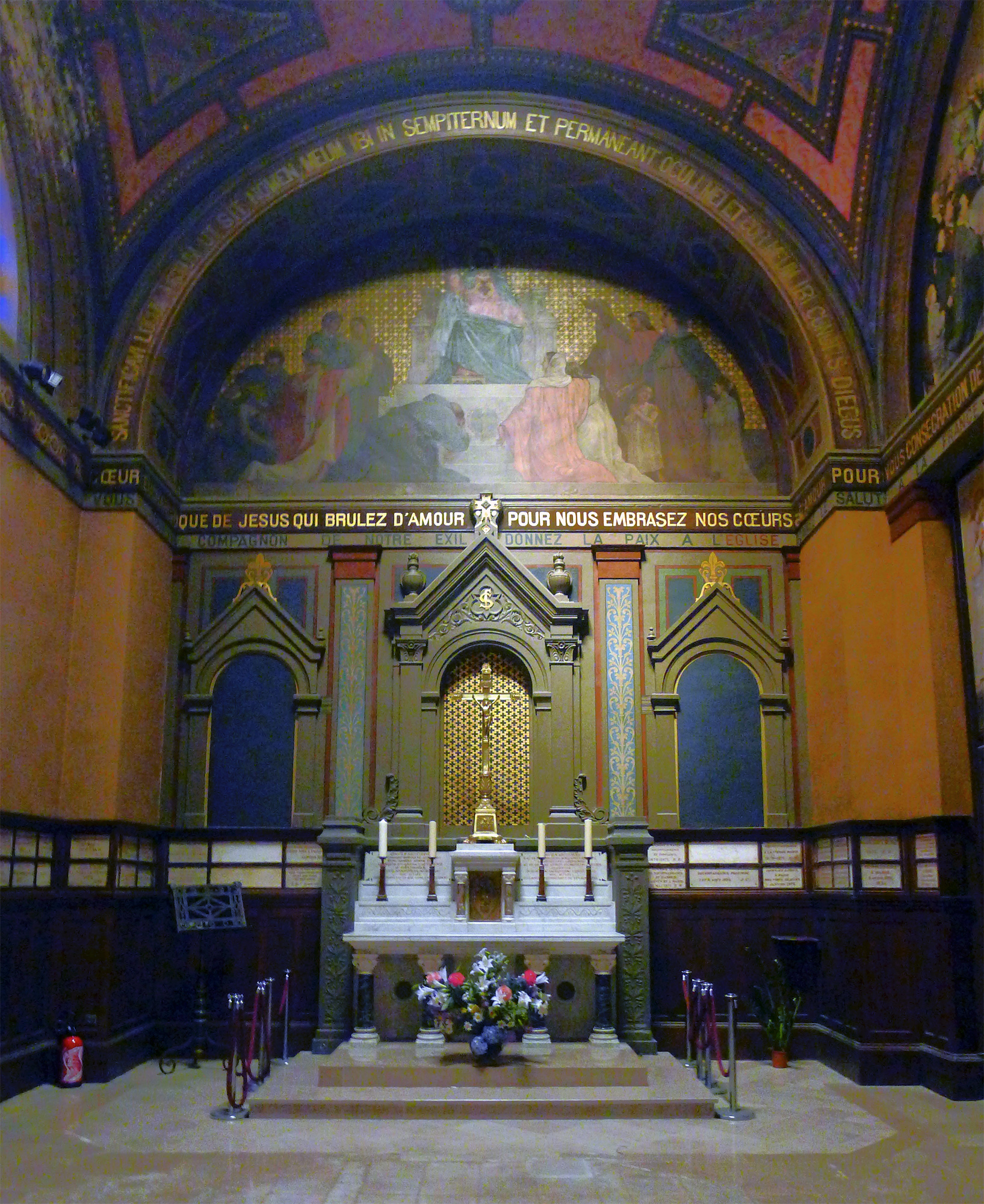
Chapel of the Sacred Heart

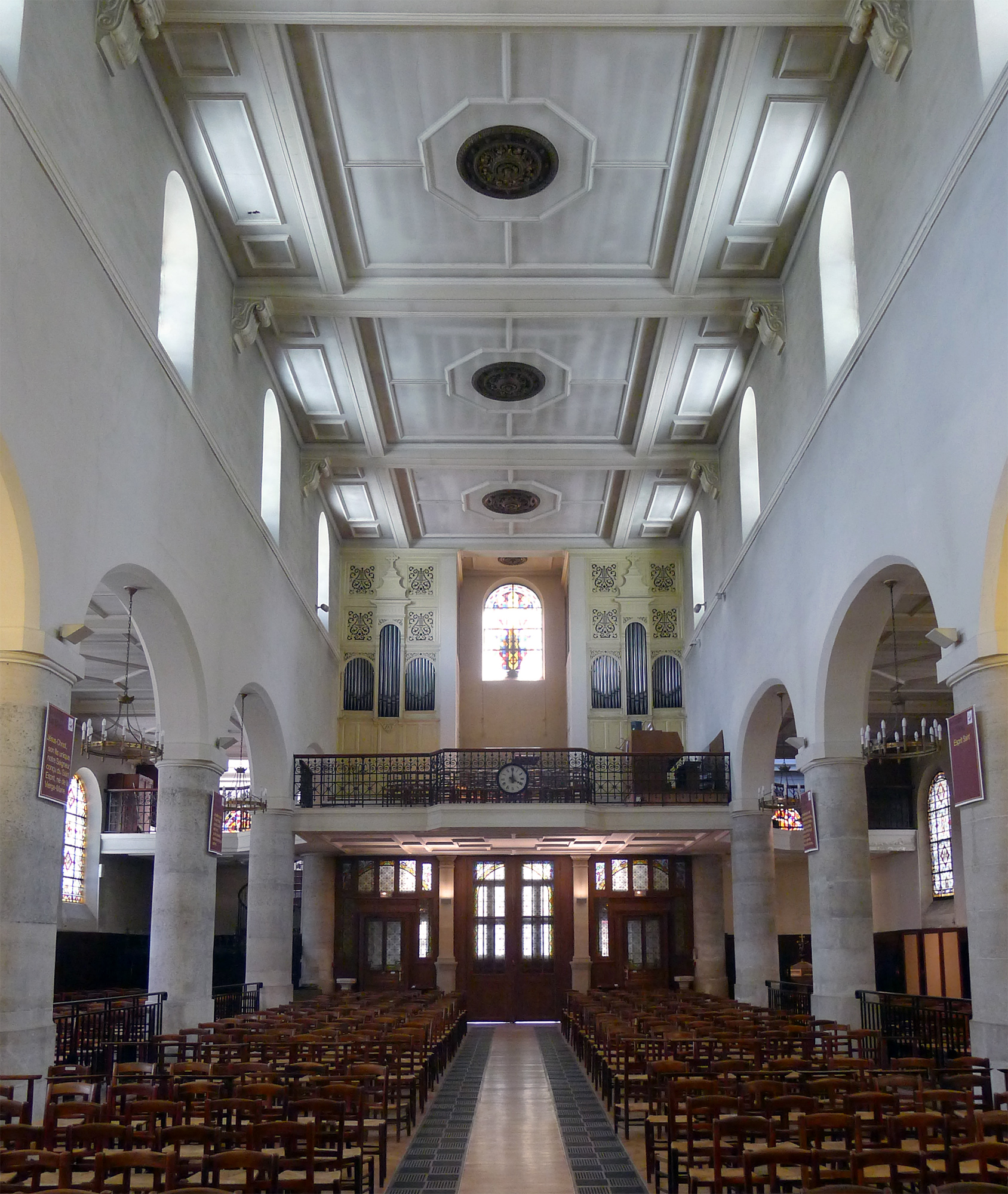
The nave facing the portal

The interior is especially striking because of the contrast between the sobriety of the nave, with its white walls and geometric decoration, and the choir, entirely covered with frescoes and decoration.

The interior is composed of three naves. The two lateral aisles of the naves extend behind the choir, where they meet in the chevet, in front of the apse chapel. There is no vaulted ceiling, only a simple ceiling.

=== Choir ===
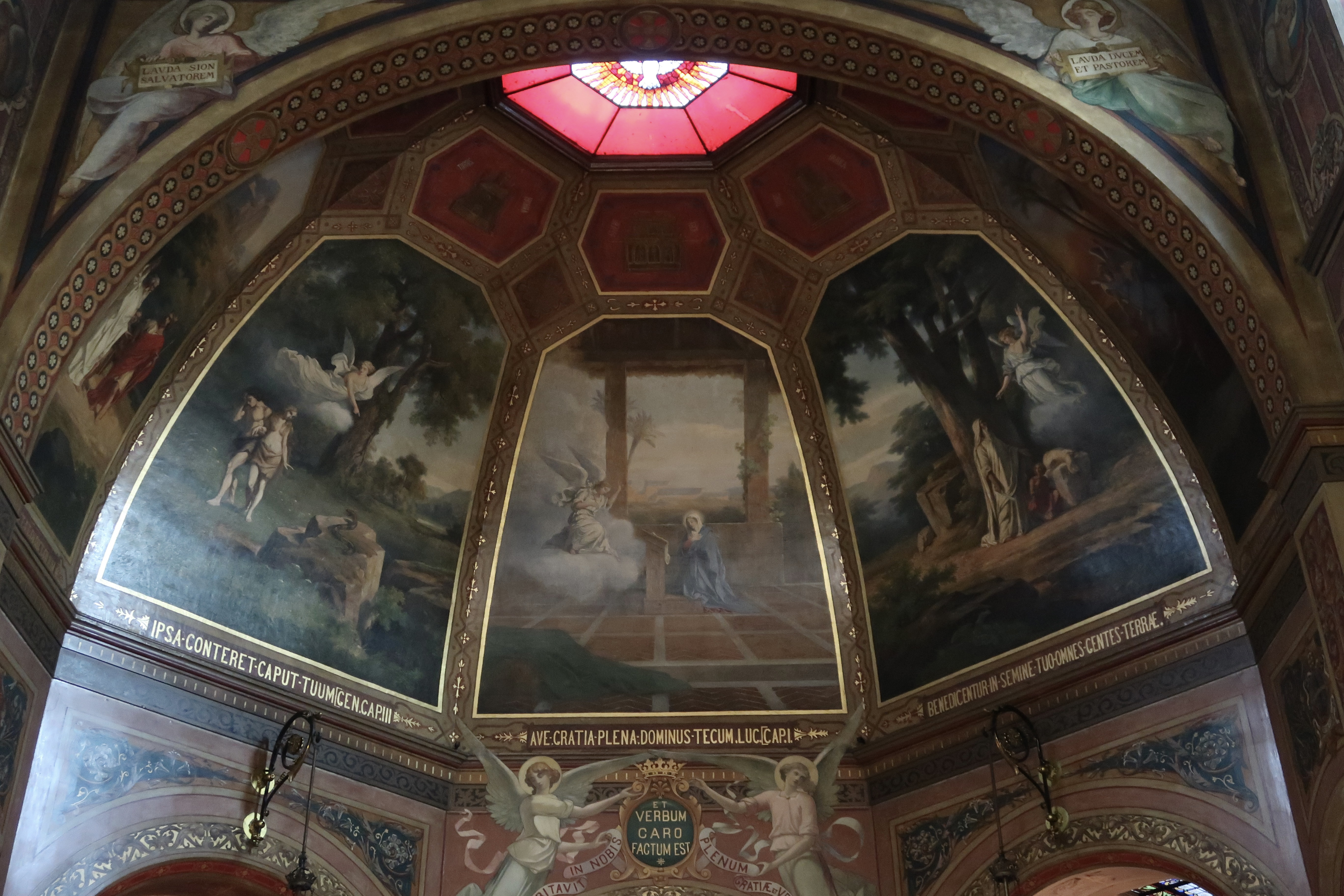
Detail of the choir frescoes

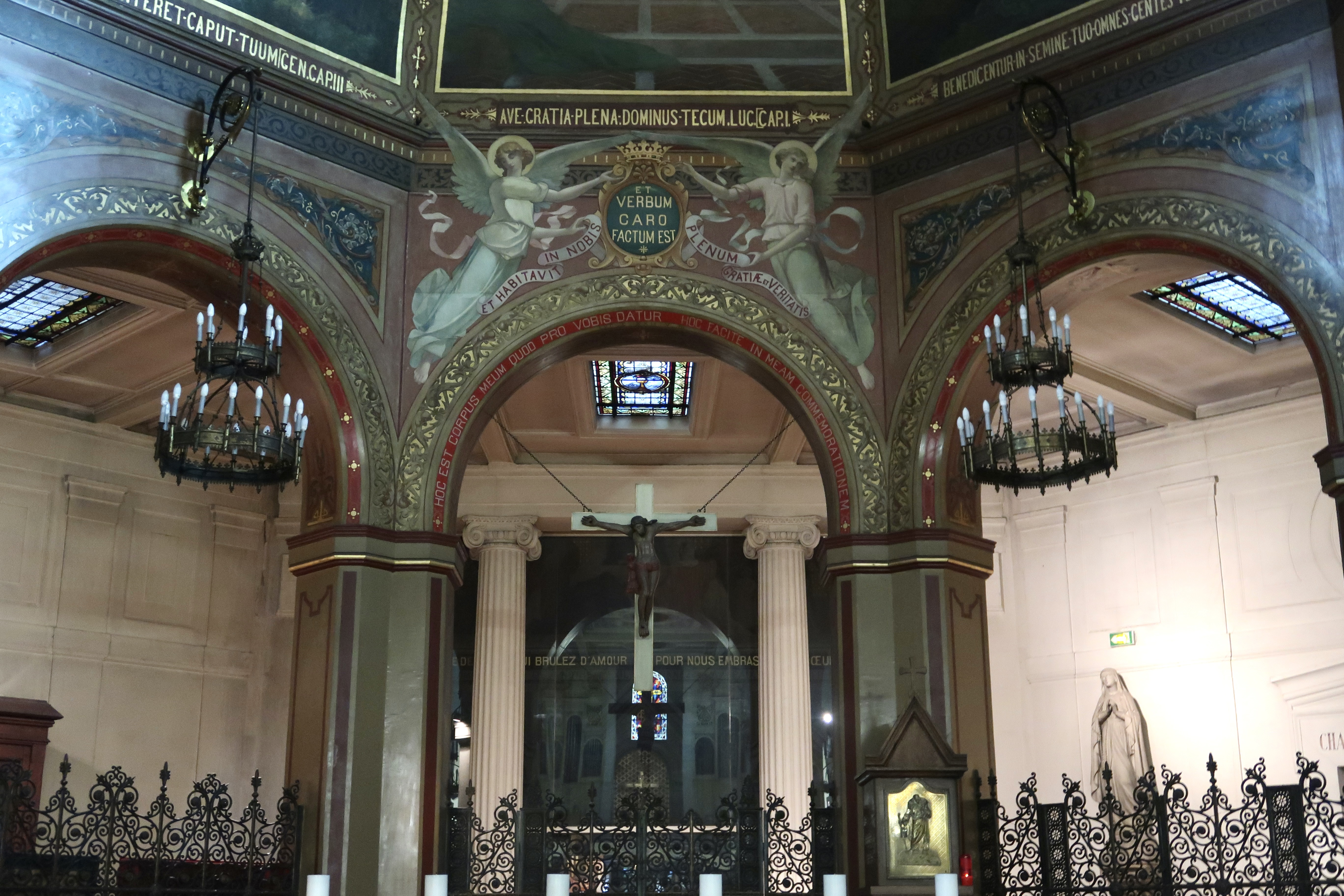
The Altar in the choir

The choir is decorated with five frescoes made by Gabriel Bouret between 1847 and 1850. He was a contemporary of Camille Corot, and Corot's influence is evident in the landscapes paintings. The frescoes represent, from left to right, the Prophet Isaiah (now barely visible); Adam and Eve being expelled from Paradisel; the Annunciation (center), the Sacrifice of Isaac and the prophecy of Daniel (also barely visible).

The plan for the frescoes was designed by the Abbot Corbiere, who served in the parish from 1846 until 1852. The frescoes are surrounded by elaborate frames, which depict the symbols of the Virgin; the mystical rose, the ivory tower of throne of Solomon, the arch of the alliance, the tower of David, and the orchard of Aaron.

The marble altar in the choir has its own history. It was made in the reign of Charles X of France. Beside the altar is a statue of Notre-Dame de Grace Passy. Around the choir are more statues: Notre Dame de Lourdes, Saint Therese de Liseux, Saint Anthony of Padua, and Saint Vincent de Paul. The interior is especially striking because of the contrast between the austerity of the nave, with its white walls and formal geometric design, and the choir, entirely covered with colourful frescoes. The ceiling of the nave is divided into geometric sections. The arcades have rounded arches and the columns are bare of decoration. The only decoration in the nave comes from the colourful geometric stained glass windows on the outer aisles.

== New Church ==
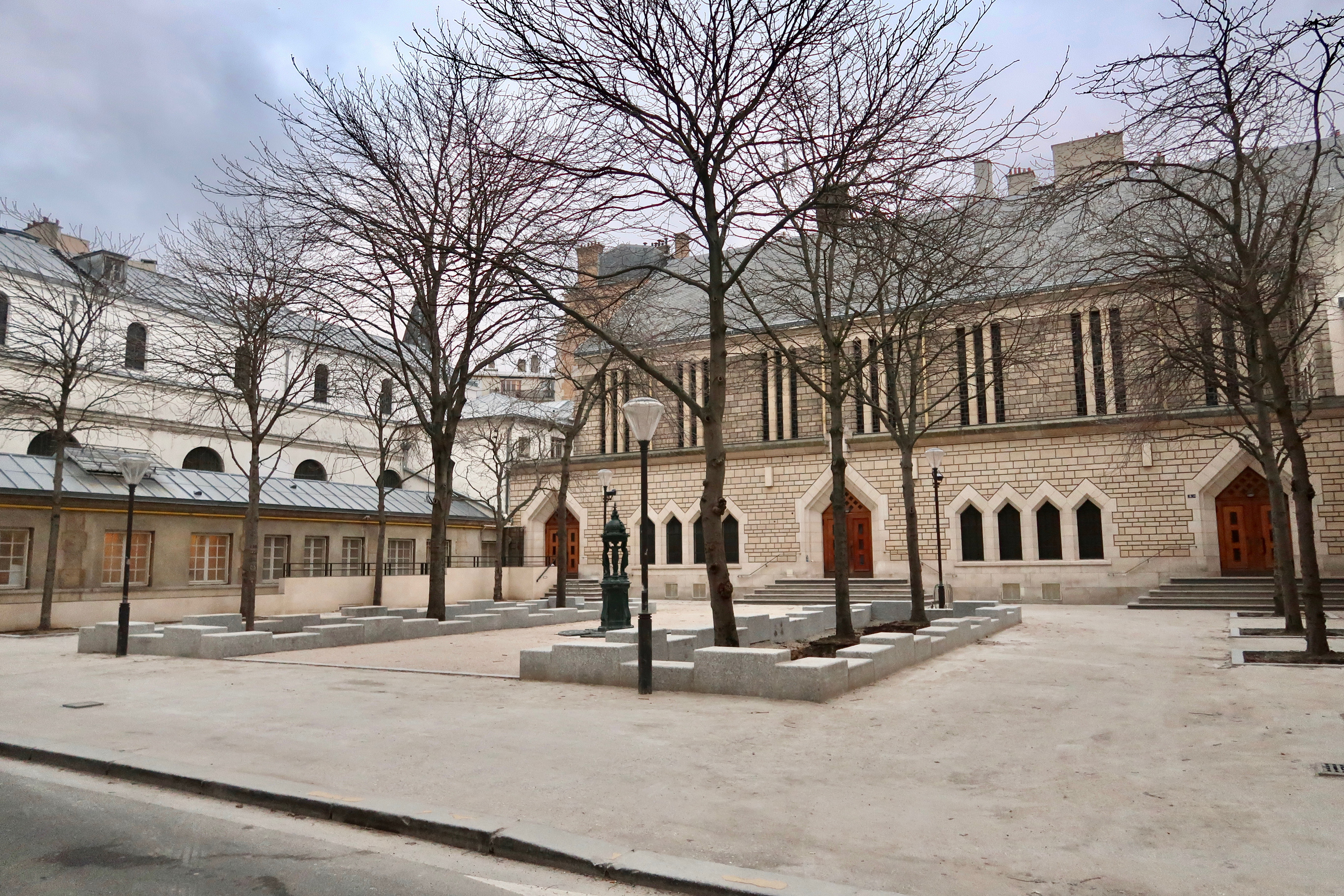
The New Church (1956–61) to the right of the old church

The New Church was built between 1956 and 1961 to the right of the old church, which connects with it at the Sacristy. It was consecrated in 1959. The new church was designed by Paul Hulot and François Alépée. It is an immense nave fifty meters long and nineteen meters wide, and can seat 1200 persons. The choir is topped by large stained glass windows, and a main altar made of black marble, surrounded by statues of the Twelve Apostles. A large block of slate excavated from the earth symbolises the figure. At the base of the choir is a statue of the Virgin. On either side of the choir are large organs, and at the end of the choir is a large fresco representing the Biblical Last Judgement.

Next to the new church is a garden with fruit trees and flowers, where religious processions take place. Within the garden is the small area where the 17th century Presbytery stood, and the chapel of the Notre Dame de Bon-Secours in the 19th century.

== Art and decoration ==
=== Stained glass ===
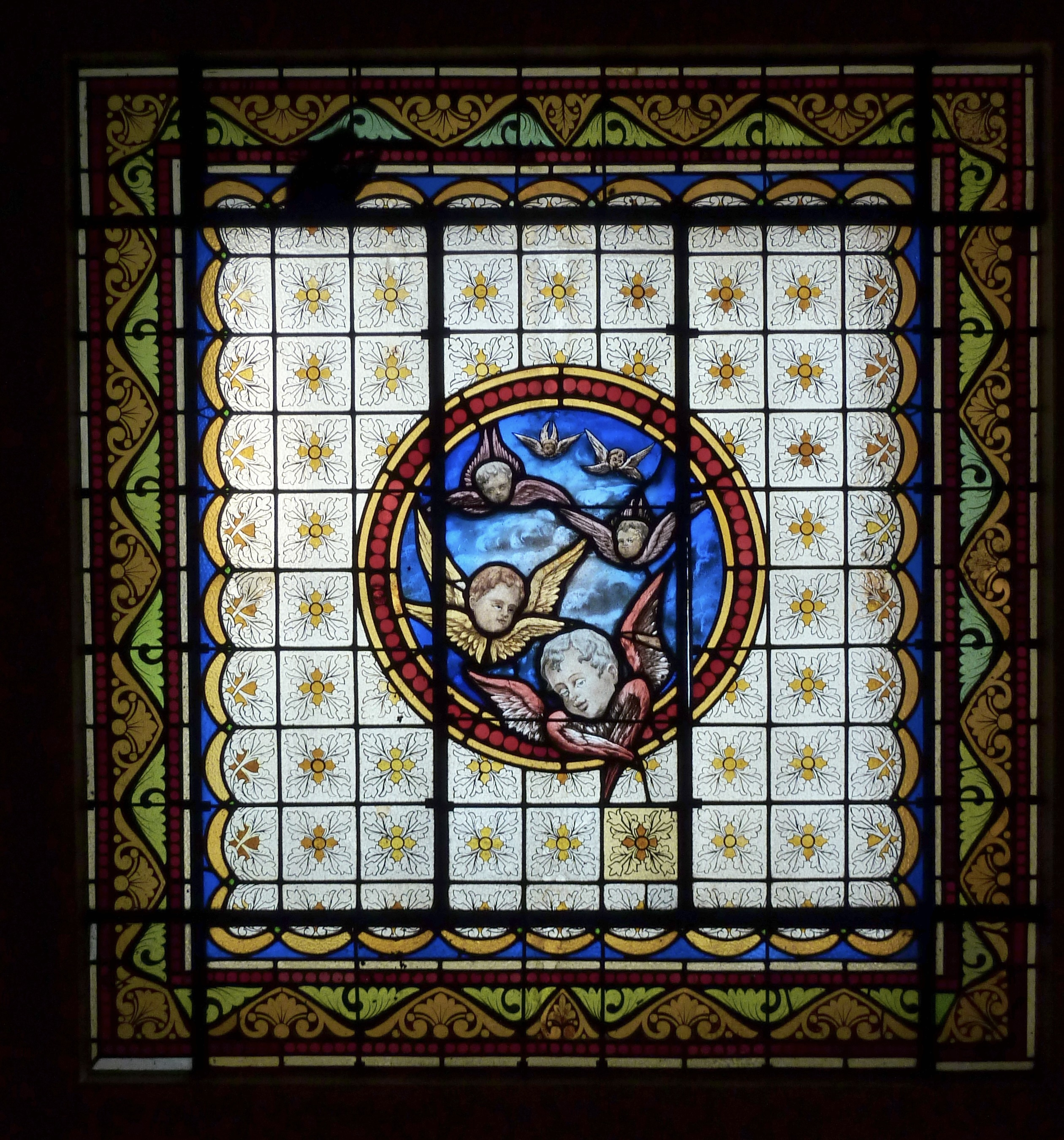
"A Flight of Angels"

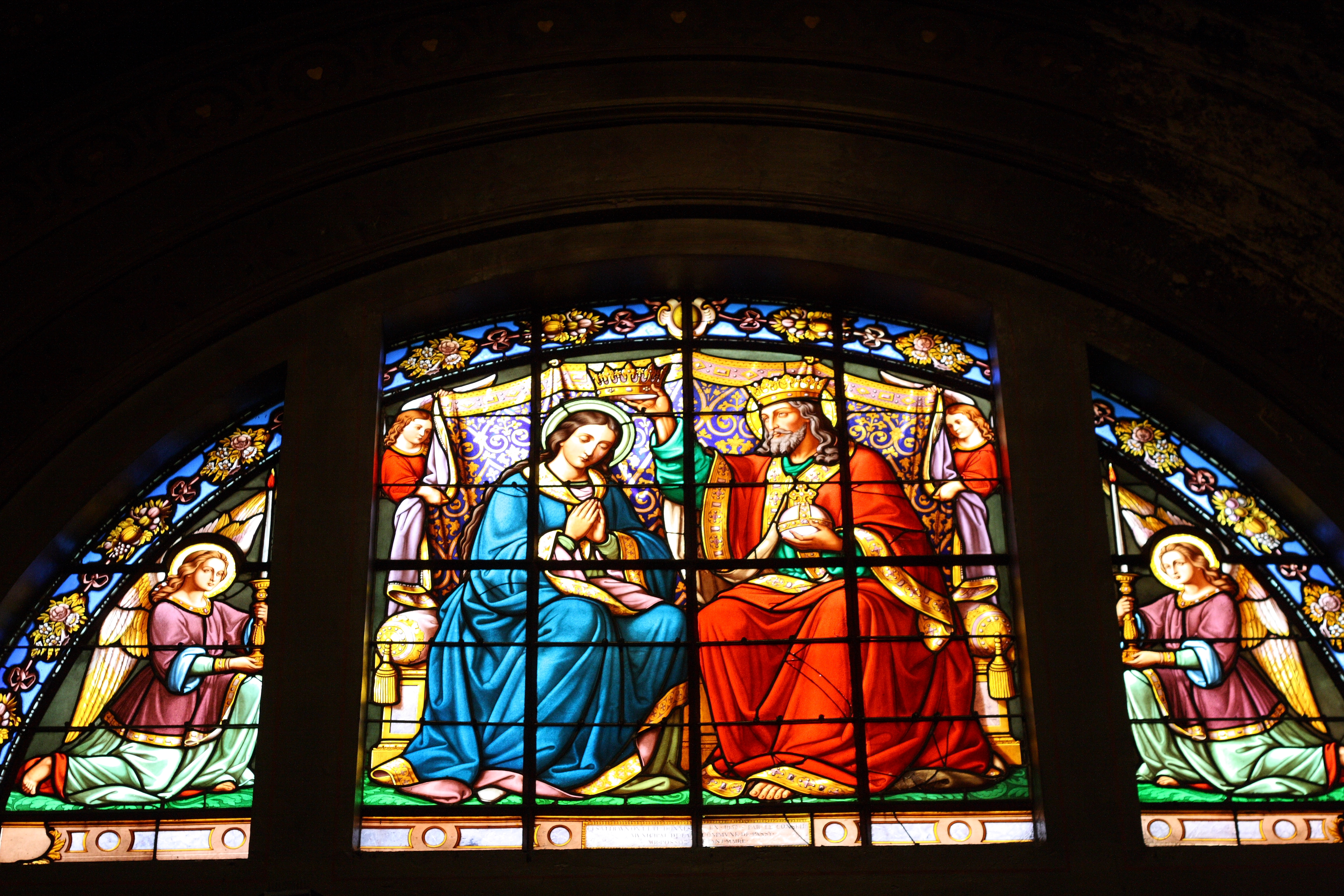
"The Coronation"

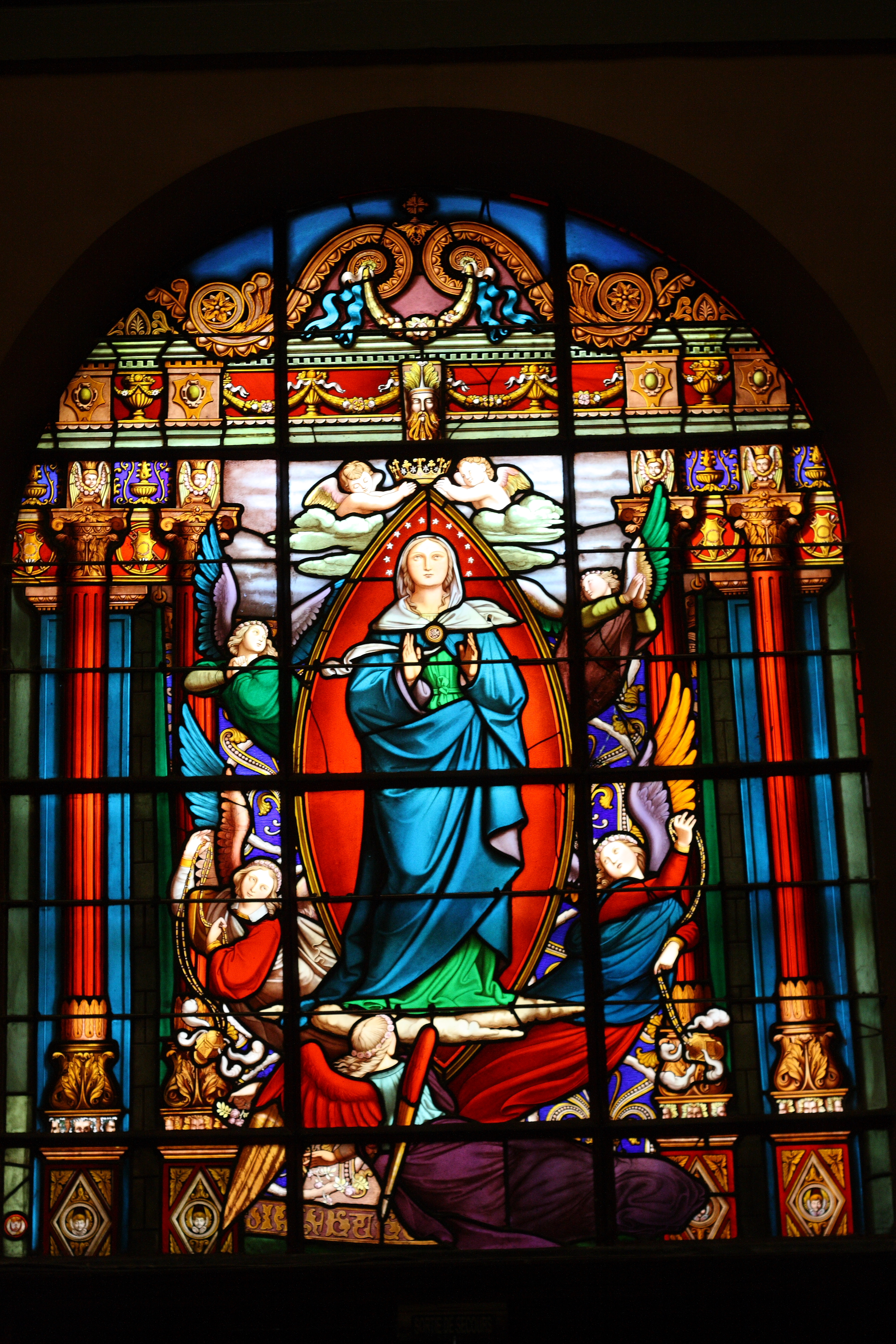
"The Virgin Mary"

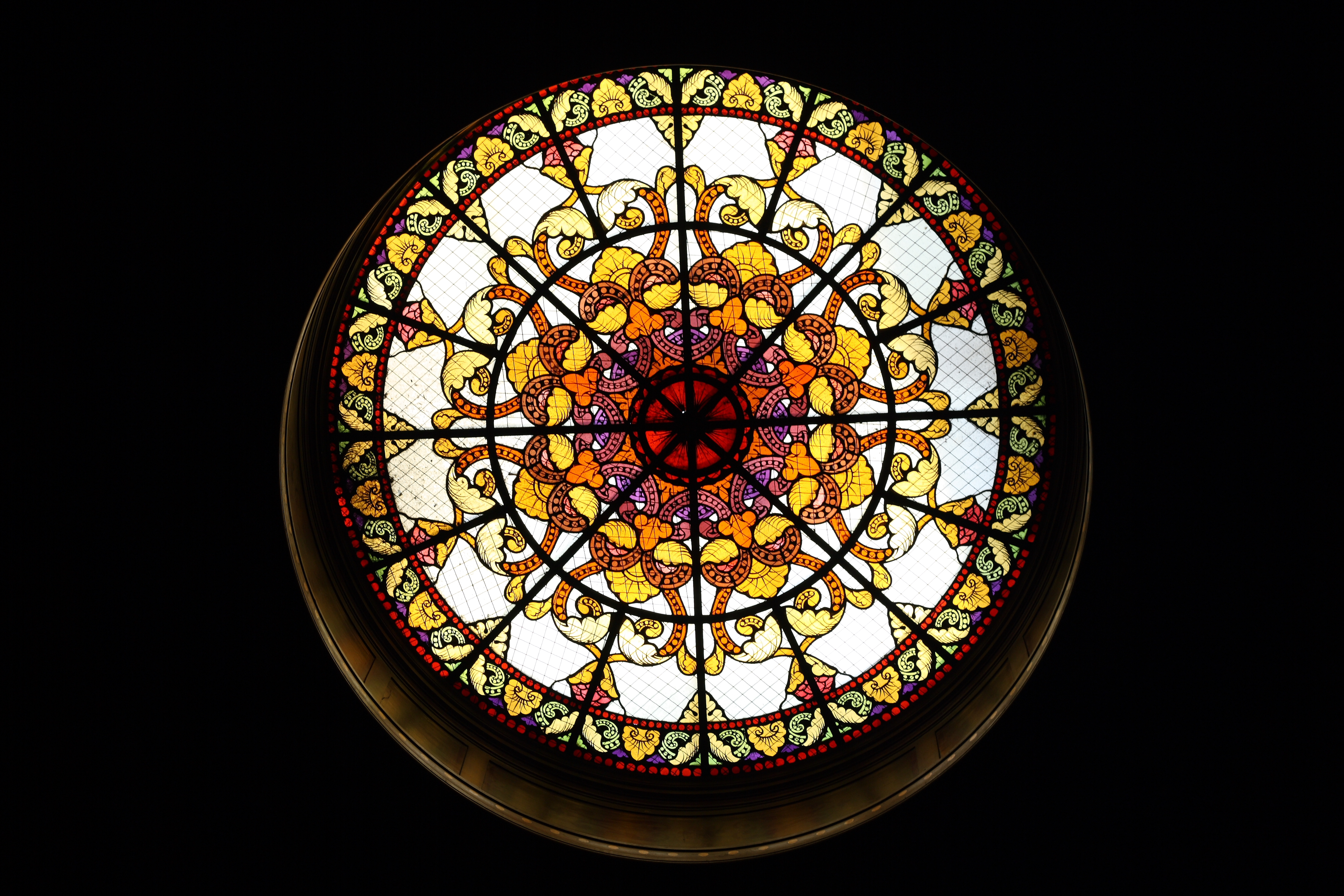
"Flowers"

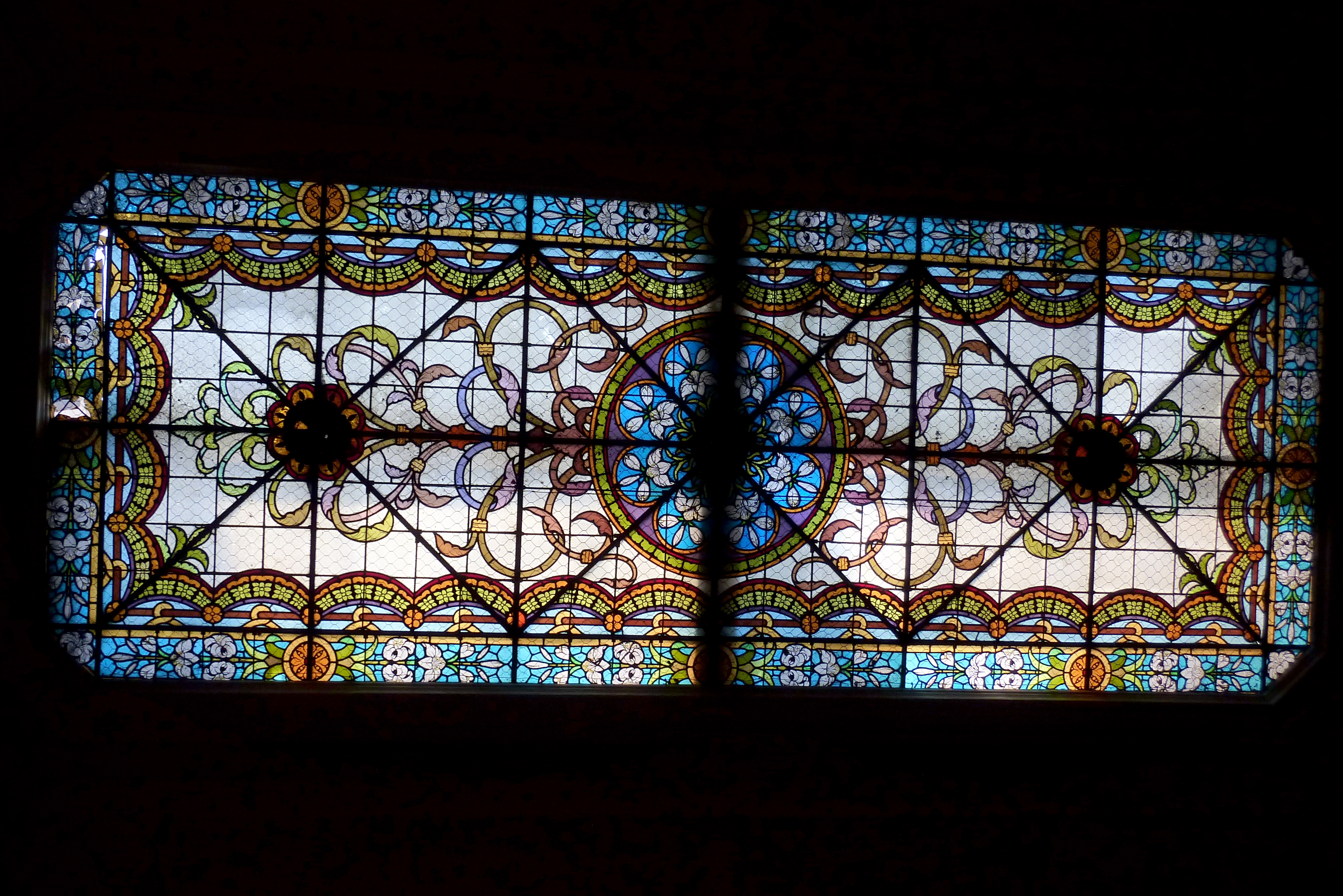
"Lilies"

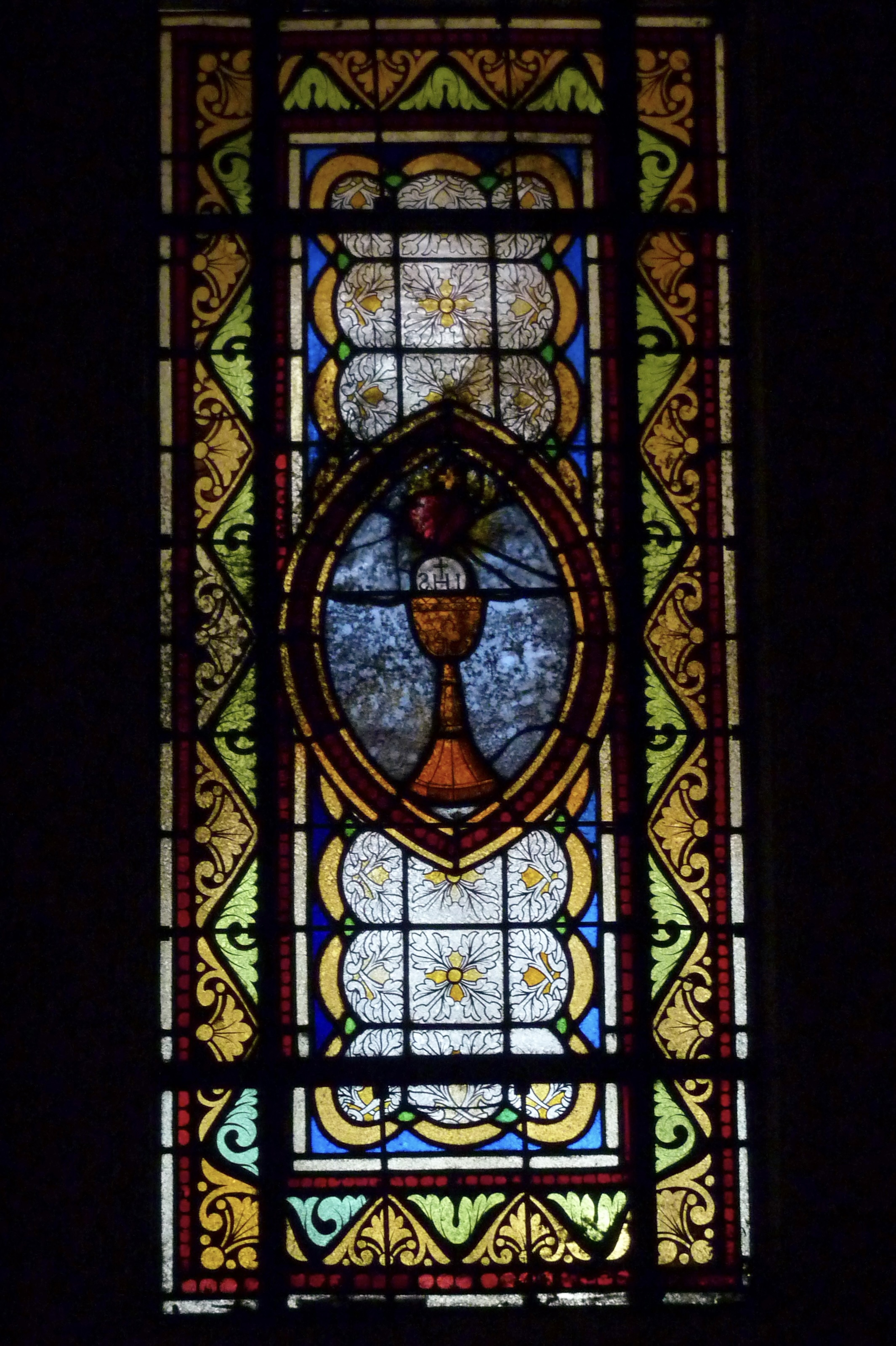
The Sacred Host

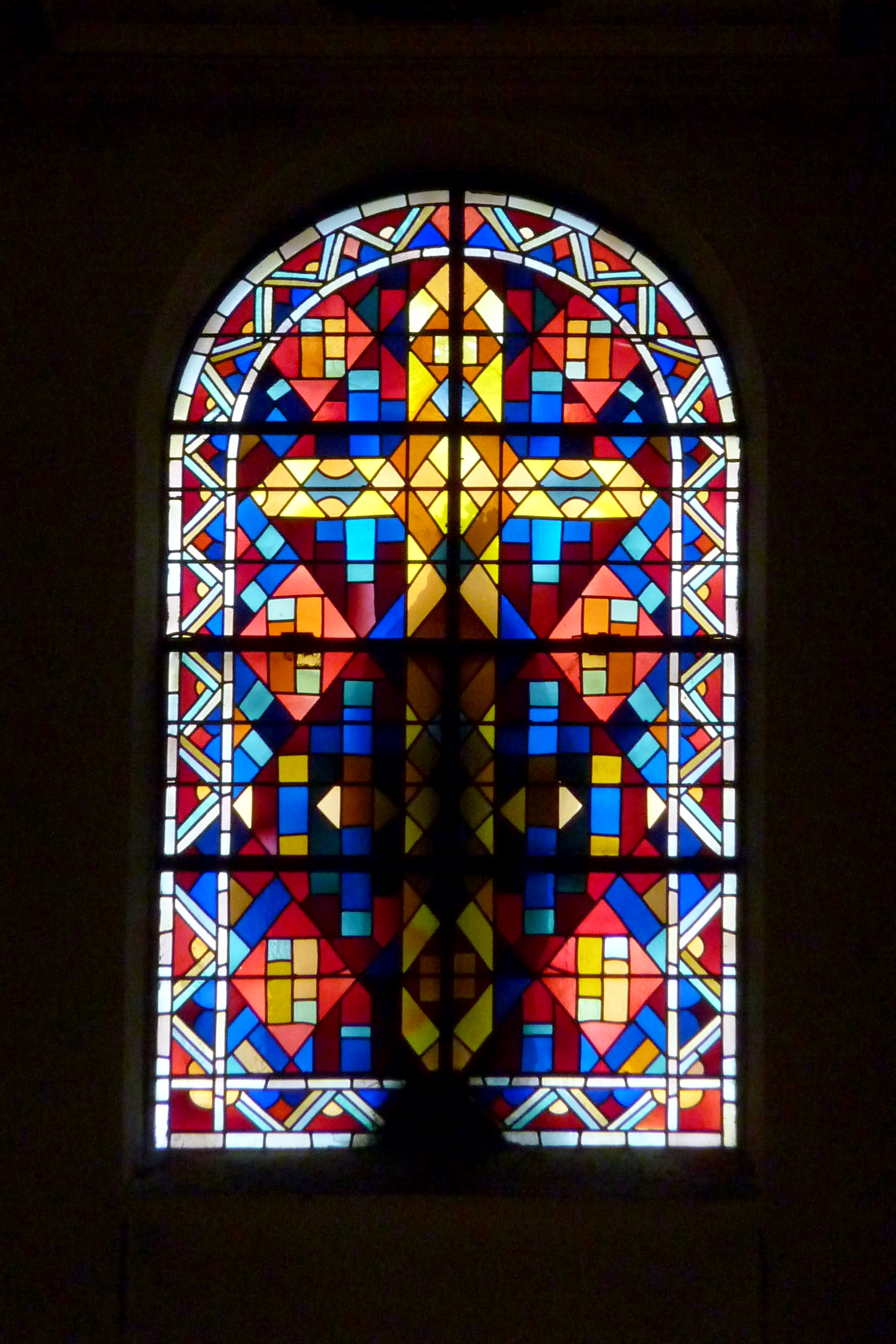
Window over the Tribune

== Organ ==
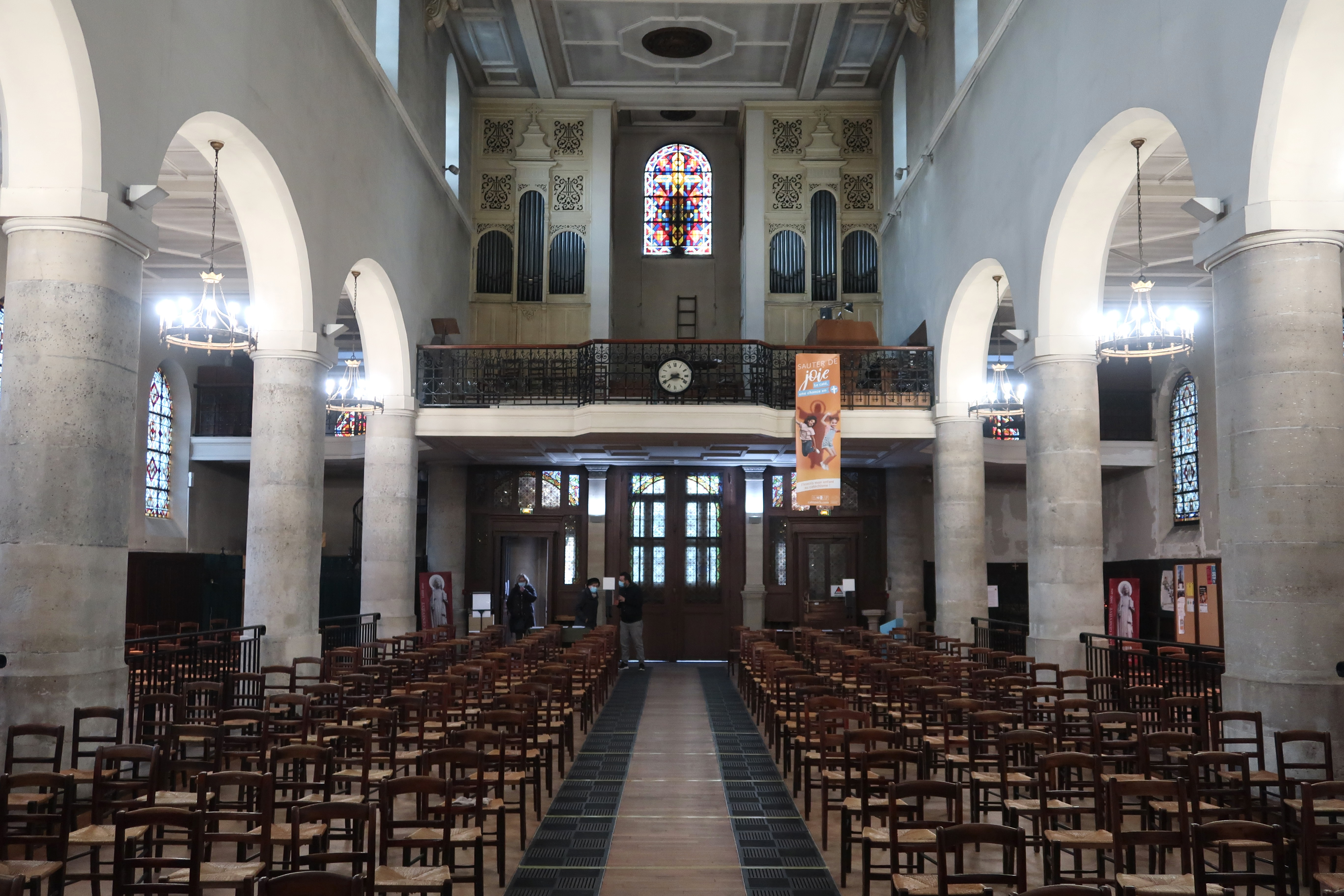
The organ in the tribune

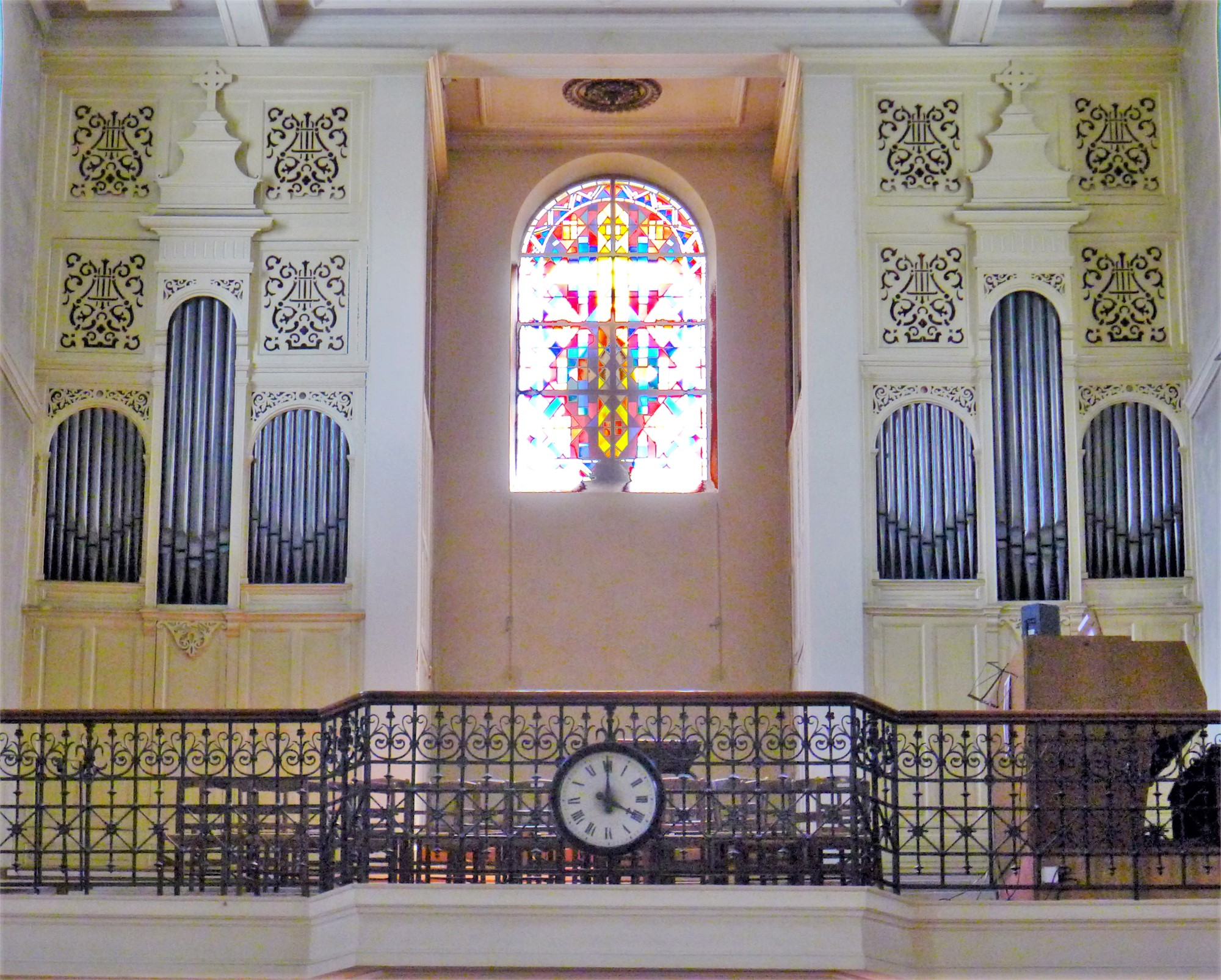
The organ in the tribune ;

The organ in the tribune is almost hidden by the architecture. It was built in 1905 by the workshops of Joseph Merklin, and was modified in 1923 and electrified in 1930. The organ has two parts, separated by a stained glass window.
