= Marie-Thérèse Schins =

German-Dutch painter, journalist and author (born 1943)

Marie-Thérèse Schins (born 21 August 1943) is a German-Dutch journalist, painter and writer.

== Life and work ==
Schins was born in Venlo, Netherlands. She trained there as a children's librarian and headed the Central Children's Library in Nijmegen. She also worked in children and youth libraries in Hanover. Schins has been a freelance author, journalist and painter in Hamburg since 1974, working as a professor for creative writing in the Aesthetics and Communication course at the Hamburg University of Applied Sciences. She has translated children's literature from Dutch. Schins is co-founder of the Institute for Mourning Work at the Evangelical Hamburg Academy.

For several years she has been building a network for disadvantaged children in India.

== Selected publications ==
- Ich bleibe in Ghana! Amas Reise, 2018
- Alte Menschen sind von ganz früher, 2018
- Schau mal über den Tellerrand: Afrika!, 2018
- Wie geht es dir, so weit von hier?, 2019
- Greetjes gesammelte Geheimnisse, 2020
