= Marie-Thérèse of Spain =

Marie-Thérèse of Spain may refer to:

- Maria Theresa of Spain (1638-1683), Queen of France
- Infanta Maria Teresa Rafaela of Spain (1726-1746), Dauphine of France
