= Adrienne Roy-Vilandré =

Quebecois soprano and folklorist

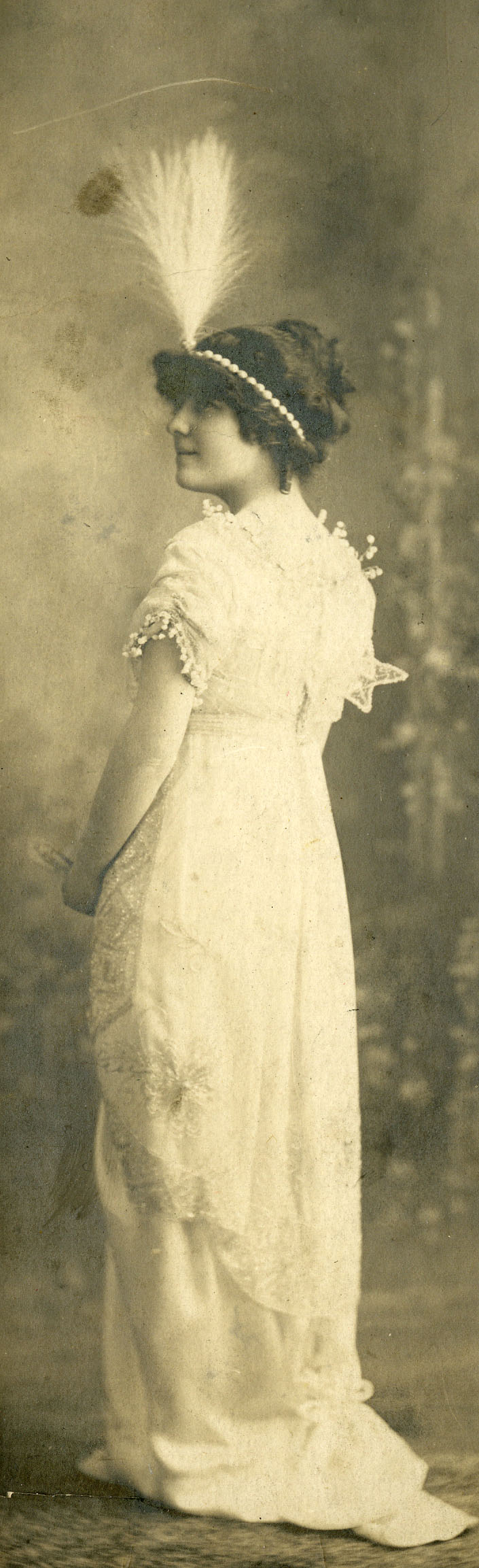
- Born: February 13, 1893; Lévis, Quebec, Canada
- Died: October 23, 1978 (aged 85); Montreal, Quebec, Canada
- Other names: Yohadio
- Occupation(s): singer, folklorist

Adrienne Roy-Vilandré was a soprano and folklorist from Quebec. She gave hundreds of performances in the province, frequently participated in radio broadcasts, and, using the pen name Francine, contributed articles to French-language newspapers and magazines. In addition to French-Canadian folk songs, her performances often included works in Mohawk and other Native Indian languages.

== Biography ==
Adrienne was born in Lévis, Quebec on February 13, 1893, to A. R. Roy and Dubiana Deslauriers. Her father was a shareholder of a local Lévis newspaper, Le Quotidien de Lévis which Adrienne would later contribute to as a travel writer. She attended school run by Ursulines nuns in Quebec City and later travelled Europe with her parents. She studied singing in Quebec with Isa Jeynevald-Mercier and her husband François-Xavier Mercier, as well as Victor Occellier and Berthe Roy before making her debut at the Club musical de Quebec in 1913. By 1916, she had secured a role in André Messager's "Véronique." In 1922 she travelled to Paris where she studied with Jane Berthori for two years. During this time she attended a song concert given by Yvette Gilbert and was inspired to devote herself to folklore. Upon her return to Quebec in 1926 she was one of the first to sing works by Honegger, Milhaud and Poulenc in the country.

Roy-Vilandré gave hundreds of recitals across Canada as part of the Alliance francaise, l'Association France-Canada, and the Canadian Institute of Music and her work saw renewed interest during Expo 67 as the Amerindian Pavilion drew on her work. She also performed for radio stations such as CKAC (Montreal) and CBOFT (Ottawa) in Canada, in New York for French-Canadian communities, and at the studio of French composer Charles Lagourgue. In addition, she published reviews and articles about music under the nom de plume "Francine" for Quebec publications such as Le Miroir, L'Autorité and Le Jour.

Her recitals were often structured as bi-cultural events where she would first perform French Canadian folk songs followed by a selection of "Indian" songs selected from across Canada.

== Performance of indigenous music and culture ==
In the 1930s, anthropologist Marius Barbeau taught Roy-Vilandré several dialects of local Mohawk communities. She began incorporating Indigenous motifs and folklore into her repertoire and performed songs collected from Gitxsan, Huron, Kootenay, Sioux, and Tuscarora nations. It is unclear if she conducted fieldwork herself as she is quoted as having memorized and interpreted songs held at the National Museum of Canada. She was known to dress in native costume and would accompany her singing with a tom-tom and "chichigwam" or gourd rattle.

Roy-Vilandré claimed that, in recognition of her commitment to preserving culture, the Mohawks of Kahnawake gifted her the name Yohadio (meaning "clear voice in the woods" and occasionally attributed as "Yodahio" or "Princesse Ichadio" ) and made her an honorary member of the community in 1934.

== Personal life ==
Adrienne Roy married Dr. Joseph-Dollard Vilandré around 1916. The couple settled in the small village of La Tuque where Joseph ran a medical practice while Adrienne organized benefit concerts for local causes. They would later abandon his medical practice in Quebec and decamp to Paris with their children, where she was able to pursue her musical training and he was able to continue his medical studies. The couple would later travel throughout Europe and North Africa before returning to Canada. When Dr. Vilandré died, she took up paying gigs to make a living. She later met and married Maxime De Lacamp, Marquis de Ruzé d'Effiat, a member of the French aristocracy in 1949.

She had four children: philanthropist Rolande, Michèle, artist and sculptor Adrien Vilandré and architect Gilles Vilandré.

== Recordings ==
- Chants indiens | Indian songs : 1963 Lon MLP-10030.
- Chansons populaires du Canada français | Popular Songs of French Canada . F. Beauchamp 1965; Lon MLP-10057
- Chants amérindiens / Indian Songs of North America : 1966; Poly 542–506.
- Welcome Friend - Sekon Tewatonro - Bienvenue : 1967; Poly CP-5001.
- Canada 100 / Indian Folk Songs of Canada : (1967); Poly CP-5002.
- Chants amérindiens : M. Vilandré sop, N. Gagnon tén, R.A. Le Clerc basse; (1972); YDO 8001.
- Reflets de traditions québécoises II : 1975; Opus OP-249.
- Yodahio (voix claire) : (1976?); à compte d'auteur.

== Awards and honours ==
- Médaille de la ville de Paris (1957)
- L'Ordre de Saint-Jean de Jerusalem (1973)
