= Marie-Thérèse Charlotte de Lamourous =

Venerated French Catholic

Marie-Thérèse de Lamourous (November 1, 1754 – September 14, 1836) was a French laywoman who was a member of the underground Catholic Church during the French Revolution. After the Revolution she founded a house for repentant prostitutes at Bordeaux called La Maison de La Miséricorde ("The House of Mercy").

== Early life ==
Marie Thérèse Charlotte de Lamourous was born at Barsac, Gironde on November 1, 1754. She was the first of 11 children born to Louis Marc Antoine de Lamourous du Mayne and Elisabeth de Vincens de Lamourous du Mayne. Only five children survived into adulthood. Both families were prominent and very old French nobility. Louis Marc Antoine was a lawyer (after his father) and was attached to the Bordeaux parlement.

The family moved to Bordeaux in 1766, when de Lamourous was 12. She received her First Communion in 1767 and was educated by her mother, who had attended a convent school. Marie Thérèse was educated in the traditional subjects of mathematics, reading, and writing, but also in agriculture.

== The French Revolution ==
With the outbreak of the French Revolution in 1789, de Lamourous (then 35) engaged in the underground Catholic Church. She was an important link in the network of ministries and good works that developed under the vicar general of the Archdiocese of Bordeaux, Joseph Boyer. Aside from visiting the sick, teaching catechism, visiting prisoners and helping to keep the clergy in touch, de Lamourous, dressed as a peasant, would enter the offices of the committee of supervision and read the list of planned arrests and executions while pretending to clean the building. She used this information to help people escape the guillotine.

In 1794 authorities in Paris expelled all French nobility from France's port cities. De Lamourous, her father, two sisters, and two very young nephews moved to the family’s estate at Pian. De Lamourous would still return to Bordeaux frequently to continue her ministries there.

The parish at Pian was without a priest and de Lamourous became like a pastor for that congregation. She gathered people together for Sunday worship, taught catechism and even "heard" confessions (she could not grant absolution, but she listened and gave advice). In the absence of a priest, she made her confession to a portrait of Vincent de Paul. Despite all these ministries she was able to live a rather secluded and contemplative life in a small hermitage on her property.

With the rise of Napoleon in 1800 the Revolution ended and de Lamourous (now 46) was able to move back and forth from Bordeaux freely.

== Return to Bordeaux ==
Before the Revolution Jeanne Germaine de Pichon, a good friend of de Lamourous, had begun a ministry of rehabilitating prostitutes (called filles) who wished to leave that way of life. This need was even greater after the Revolution, when de Pichon approached de Lamourous to take over this ministry. At first de Lamourous was horrified at the thought as she had been raised to believe that these women were entirely disgraceful. Her friend and spiritual director, the priest Chaminade, was at first opposed to this, as he wanted de Lamourous to help with his Sodality; but he left the decision up to her. De Lamourous visited the filles. While there she experienced a profound sense of calm, peace, and joy. She found the women pleasant and comforting. However upon leaving her feelings of reproach and uneasiness returned. After an illness, and a very bad dream about the future of the filles, de Lamourous agreed to visit the house again, absentmindedly grabbing her nightcap as she left. On January 2, 1801 she toured the house, again met with the filles, and again was filled with the same warm feelings from before. As the day drew to a close, she escorted de Pichon and Chaminade to the door, and saw them out saying: "I will stay here." She became the "Bonne Mère" ("Good mother") to the filles ("daughters") and the work was called La Maison de La Miséricorde ("The House of Mercy"). De Lamourous chose Our Lady of Mercy as patron of the house.

== The Sisters of Miséricorde ==
This was to be de Lamourous major focus and work for the rest of her life, but getting started wasn't easy; the women were of varied ages and came from all walks of life, bickering, fighting, and accusations were a part of everyday life. To combat this, and to help form the women into virtuous, dedicated, sincere Christians, de Lamourous wrote a strict daily schedule for the house, divided strictly into prayer times, meal times, work periods, and recreation periods. The Miséricorde was unique because the staff (called directresses) and the filles shared their lives entirely, they slept in common dormitories, dined in common, worked alongside each other, and prayed in common. Over the years the Miséricorde grew from the original 15 women, to almost 300 women in 1835 (the year before de Lamourous's death). The growth required more space, and Lamourous was able to obtain the former convent of the Annunciation. The Miséricorde would stay at this location until the Bordeaux house was closed in the 1980s.

De Lamourous was not alone in her efforts to help the filles restore their lives, she had a staff of directresses that lived among the filles and provided spiritual, as well as physical support. Many of the directresses expressed a desire to become a religious institute but de Lamourous was hesitant. At that time all religious institutes were subject to regulation by the French government, and she did not want the government to be able to dictate how the community was organized and who was admitted (the Miséricorde was entirely voluntary, filles could enter and stay, or leave at any time they wished – government help would mean the house could have to accept women who were forced there after having been arrested for prostitution). In 1818, after consulting with Chaminade, the archbishop, and other advisors, de Lamourous consented to have the directresses form a religious institute. While recognized by the government as a "refuge" (a place where arrested prostitutes were sent), the Miséricorde was able to maintain its "come freely, stay freely" policy. The first sisters took vows in 1818, but not much changed in the everyday life of the house; the sisters still shared their whole lives in common with the filles.

== Chaminade and the Family of Mary ==
Sometime during the French Revolution (probably 1795) de Lamourous met a priest named William Joseph Chaminade, who was also working in the underground Catholic Church in Bordeaux. The two struck up a friendship and when she lost her previous Spiritual Director to the guillotine, she asked Chaminade to take on the role. They continued to stay in touch (mostly in writing) throughout the rest of the Revolution, even during Chaminade’s exile in Spain from 1797 to 1800. While in Spain Chaminade had received the inspiration to re-Christianise France by forming small faith communities (called "sodalities") under the patronage of the Mother of Christ; De Lamourous became a major collaborator in this effort. In addition to her duties at the Miséricorde, she was also the director of the women’s sodality, and acted as a consultant to Chaminade in business transactions.

== Beatification process ==
De Lamourous died on September 14, 1836, aged 81. She died in her room at the Miséricorde surrounded by her spiritual daughters.

Theologians approved de Lamourous's spiritual writings on 14 January 1920, and her cause was opened on 14 November 1923, granting her the title of a Servant of God. In 1989, the Sacred Congregation for the Causes of Saints decreed that de Lamourous had practiced heroic virtue during her lifetime, thus she was given the title Venerable.
