= Marie-Thérèse Dancourt =

French actress

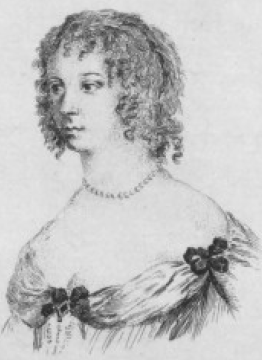
Thérèse Le Noir de la Thorillière

Marie-Thérèse Dancourt, known as Mademoiselle Dancourt (1663 – 1725), was a French stage actress.

She was engaged at the Comédie-Française and a Sociétaires of the Comédie-Française in 1685.

She is foremost known for her ingenue roles, a type of roles she continued to play until her late career.

She retired in 1720.

She was the mother of Louise Dupin and Manon Dancourt.
