= Château de Stors =

Coordinates: 49.0896°N 2.2090°E

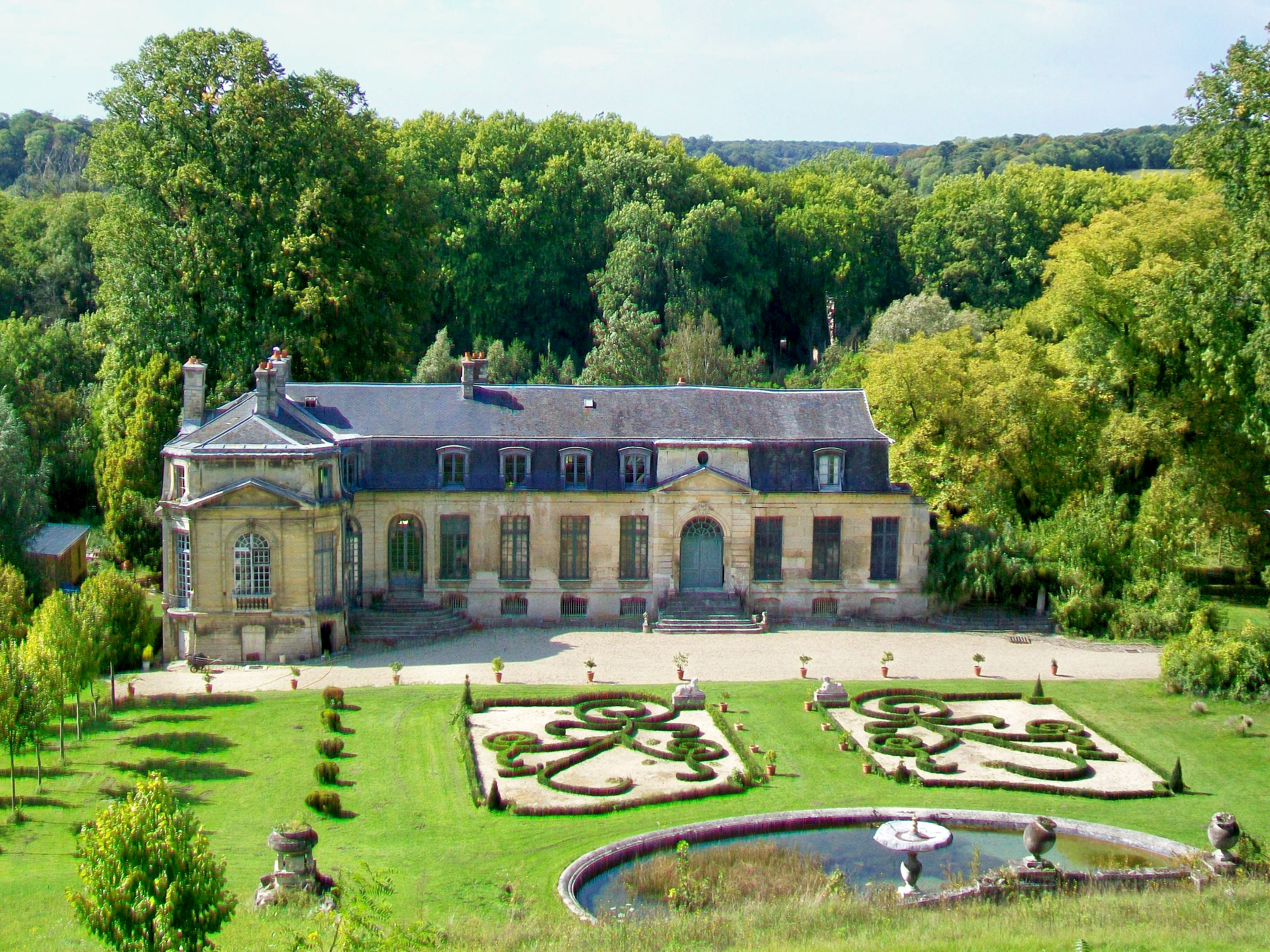
Main facade, parterres and basin.

The château de Stors is an 18th-century château in the village of Stors in L'Isle-Adam, Val-d'Oise on the hillside of the Oise valley (left bank).

The estate covers the towns of L'Isle-Adam and Mériel and is included in the vallée de Chauvry classified natural site. In the 19th century it reached to the other bank of the river, with a vegetable garden on the territory which is now covered by Butry-sur-Oise.

Built at the start of the 18th century and embellished by Pierre Contant d'Ivry for the prince de Conti, the château was badly damaged by bombing in the Second World War.

== History ==
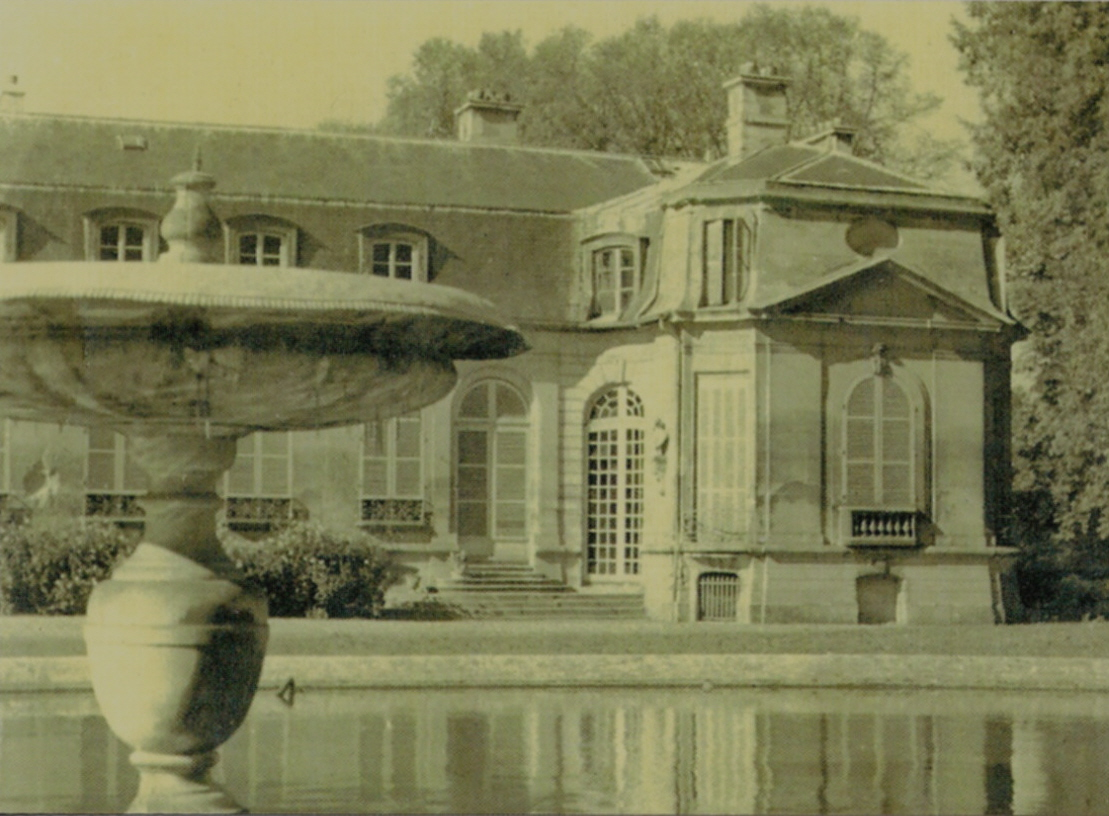
North wing of the château de Stors, c.1900. Destroyed by bombing on 18 August 1944.

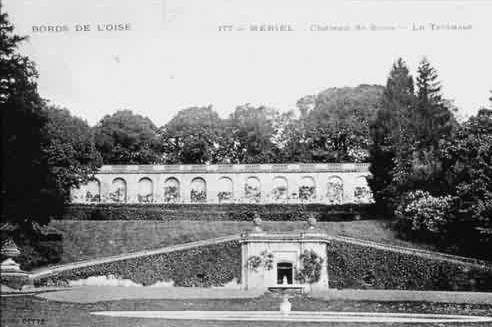
The terraces of the parc de Stors, postcard, c.1900.

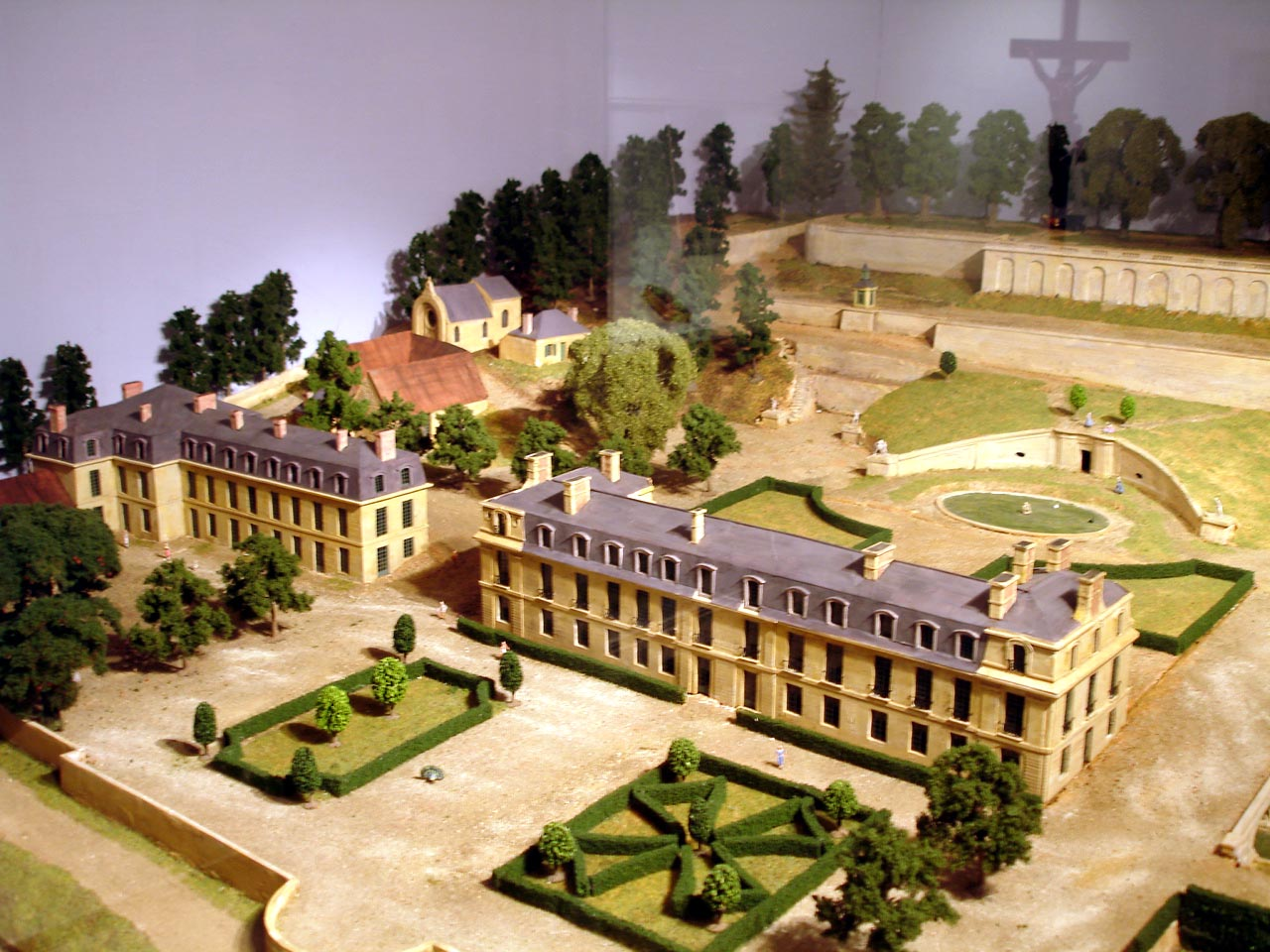
Maquette of the château de Stors at the musée Louis-Senlecq. The surviving château is the building to the right. The appearance of the towns has also drastically changed, while the house to the right of the chapel has vanished.

The first mention of an estate at Stors dates to 1093. A chapel was built there in the 12th century. A stronghold built on the hillside is recorded in a 14th-century document and as of 1435 it was inhabited by Jean de Saint-Benoit.

Described in the 16th century as a four-bay manor house with a tiled roof and dressed-stone walls, it was completely rebuilt near the river on the site of the present-day château by Denis Duval, notary and secretary to the king, and his son Jean (†1547), 'trésorier de l'épargne' to Francis I of France. They kept some elements of an earlier building whilst building a two-storey building, flanked by side pavilions and with a high roof.

The Duvals were close to Charles IX of France and Catherine de Médicis. Jean Duval's son René, advisor to Henry III of France, married Madeleine de L'Aubespine de Verderonne, who had him rebuild and expand the chapel where his heart was buried in 1624 (a marble funerary plaque survives). He died in 1595 with no issue and so she left Stors to her nephew Charles de L'Aubespine de Verderonne, who inherited it in 1624, expanding the estate and restoring the chapel.

The present building dates to the start of the 18th century and is built on the foundations of the former château, possibly around 1718 on the first marriage of his great-grandson Étienne Louis de L’Aubespine (1691–1768), marquis de Verderonne, to Françoise de Grolée de Viriville (1691–1754)

The architect behind the building is unknown. He has long been traditionally identified as Jules Hardouin-Mansart (1646–1708), but the dates render this attribution improbable. Jean Aubert (1680–1741), an architect attached to the House of Condé and active nearby in Chantilly and Chaalis has also been suggested, but no documents support this. It might also have been Mansart's nephew, pupil and collaborator Germain Boffrand (1667–1754).

The marquis de Verderonne had no heir and little by little sold off all his holdings in the area. On 26 July 1746 Louis François de Bourbon-Conti, prince de Conti bought the lordships of Villiers-Adam, Stors and Marangle for a total of 700,000 livres, wishing to expand his L'Isle-Adam estate (to which he then retired once and for all). Stors and a few surrounding lands accounted for 150,000 livres of that sum. (Note: The act was passed before Madame Roger by the prince's mother Louise Élisabeth de Bourbon-Condé and his authorised representative Jean-Baptiste de Montullé.)

He wished to turn the château into a "holiday resort for his favourites" and so summoned his official architect Pierre Contant d'Ivry to embellish the building and add a fashionable garden. Stors became a residence for one of the Prince's mistresses after another, starting with Madame Panneau d'Arty then after her death in 1765 the comtesse de Boufflers.

In 1783 the château and the rest of the properties of the last prince de Conti, Louis François Joseph de Bourbon-Conti, were sold to the future Louis XVIII, with usufruct reserved. The state confiscated it upon the French Revolution but it was not vandalised.

A hurricane on 27 January 1794 damaged the upper levels and the château's condition quickly worsened until it was bought unfurnished in 1798 by the rich lawyer and commissioner for war Isaac Ardant, also "a close friend of Masséna and the First Consul". (Note: Some sources state he was a notary and others that he was Master of Requests to the Conseil d'État, but definitely not in 1798 as such a post had ceased to exist by then and would only be revived in 1800.) He brought some of the furnishings from the château de Louveciennes to Stors, whilst his wife indulged her interest in botany by bringing "rare species from America" there.

In 1838 (or 1831) the Ardants' daughter, wife of doctor Kapeler, sold the estate to François Christophe Edmond Kellermann (1802–1868), 3rd duc de Valmy and royalist député for Toulouse. There he carried out major building work, remodelling the château's north gable, rebuilding the attic and landscaping the main steps out to the Oise. His fortunes declined and in 1861 (or 1851) he sold the estate to the rich textile merchant Casimir Cheuvreux, a judge at the tribunal de Commerce de la Seine, who used it to host writers and politicians. Léon Say, co-director of the Journal des Débats and nephew of Monsieur and Madame Cheuvreux, retired there to prepare his speeches. The Cheuvreux family enlarged the estate to 150 hectares.

In 1893 the estate passed by descent to Lannes de Montebello, who used it to welcome members of the Romanoff family such as Grand Duke Alexei Alexandrovich, Tsar Alexander III's brother. At that time it housed several mementos of Marshal Lannes, in a series of salons adorned with stucco, woodwork and "Versailles"-style parquet flooring, along with luxurious furnishings such as Beauvais tapestries, stamped furniture, goldsmith's works, sculptures and paintings, including modern works by Paul Baudry and Jules Dupré). Louis de Montebello spent the summers in Stors, though he died in 1912 at Mériel.

In 1944 Allied bombing destroyed the château's north wing and the farm on the estate. It was pillaged and vandalised from 1983 onwards and fell into ruin little by little until being threatened with demolition in the 1990s. In 1999 the Capdevielles, a couple of art lovers, bought the remains of the building and part of the park and two years later the kiosks, terraces and basin were inscribed on the Supplementary Inventory of Monuments Historiques.

In 2002 building work funded by the EU began. Several scenes in the film Les Aristos were shot at the château in 2006. At the end of 2019 a princess from the Qatar royal family bought the estate, aiming to restore it to its appearance before the Second World War.

== Components ==
The remains of the château-Mansart (18th-19th centuries) consist of the south wing, central steps leading down into gardens and a staircase leading towards the Oise. Entirely in dressed stone, this château was of the same quality as the bests country residences designed in major architectural agencies in Paris early in the 18th century, leading to its attribution to the king's chief architect Jules Hardouin-Mansart ;

There are also major communal structures built around 1840 (now known as the pavillon Valmy), whilst an 18th-century monumental double terrace in the garden, dominating both the château and the Oise, has been attributed to Pierre Contant d'Ivry. It and its underground rooms were added to the Supplementary Index of the Monuments Historiques in 2001, as was the elliptical basin and the two small pavilions restored by Louis-Charles Boileau after the style of the pagodas at Chanteloup. The landscaped park was designed by Louis-Sulpice Varé (very active in the area around l'Isle-Adam) and originally included several bodies of water and buildings which have now disappeared.

The parish chapel of Sainte-Madeleine was first built in the 12th century to serve the inhabitants of the village of Stors. René Duval, lord of Stors, had it rebuilt in 1564–1574, whilst under the Conti family its priests were Josephites. Its remarkable 18th century oculus facade is also attributed to d'Ivry. It was completely reworked early in the 19th century at the request of the 3rd Duke of Valmy and refurnished under the Second French Empire. It contains a replica of the mausoleum of Louise Cheuvreux, buried at San Luigi dei Francesi in Rome. Already damaged in the Second World War, the chapel was partially destroyed later by a falling tree and fell into ruin. Arts patrons (Fondation du patrimoine, Fondation Maxime Goury-Laffont, association de Sauvegarde de Stors) have recently banded together to restore it.

800 metres from the château, in the town of Mériel, is the 16th century 'moulin de Stors' or 'moulin Perrot', which the Cheuvreux family and the Lannes de Montebello turned into a Troubador style manor house to designs by Louis-Charles Boileau, who was in turn took inspiration for its interiors from the decor at Chenonceau. This manor house is surrounded by a parc à l'anglaise whose pond disappeared during the 20th century, giving way to marshland, a rare biotope in the Île-de-France region.

Also on the estate is the former 17th century home of the ferrymen who operated the service known as the "Tournebride", so-called because the teams had to turn around here to board the ferry. The house also housed a tavern. Its roof and woodwork were lost in a December 2017 fire.

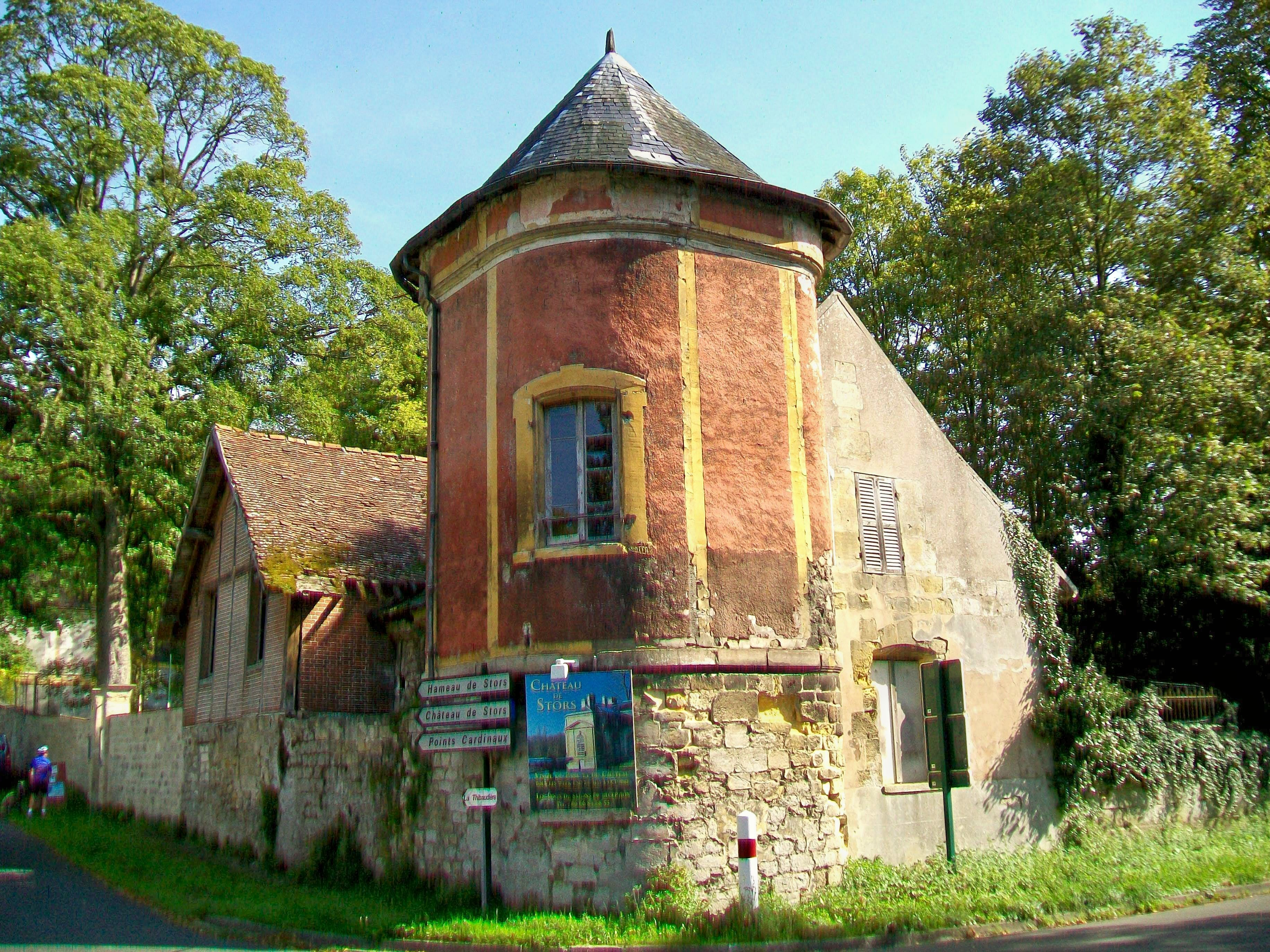
The former Au Tourne-Bride tavern.

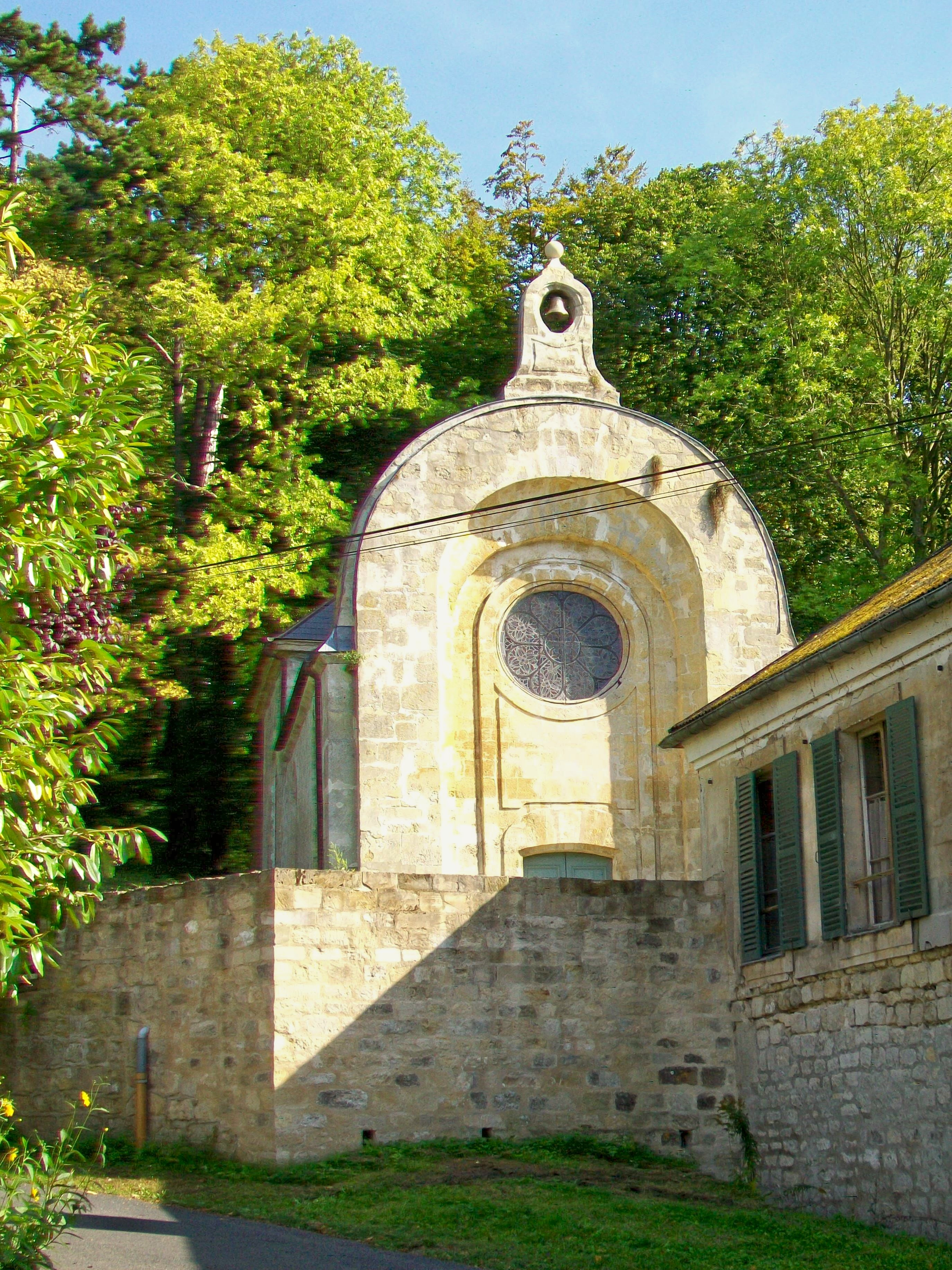
The Stors chapel after being completely restored.

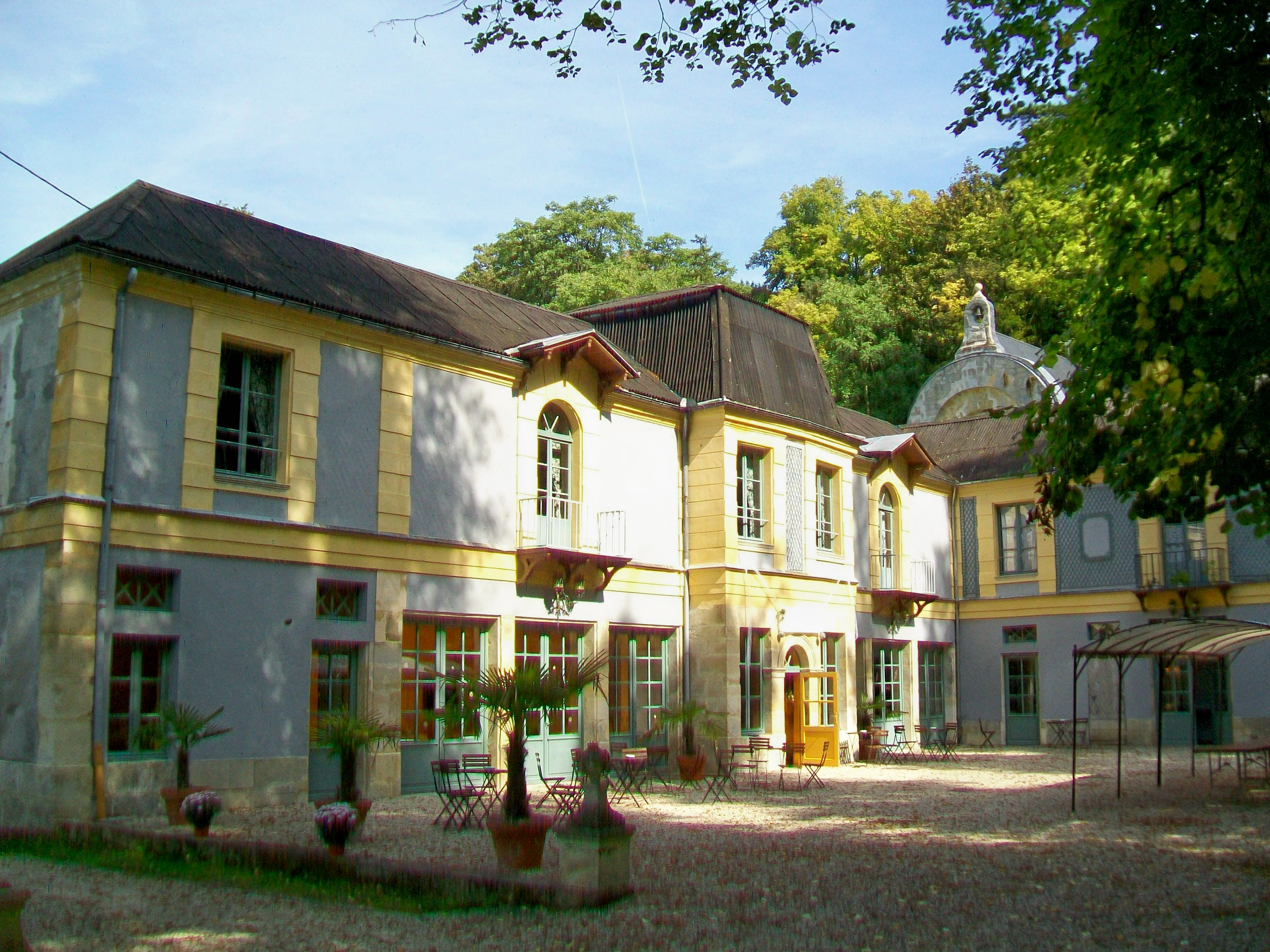
The service buildings, also known as the "pavillon Valmy".

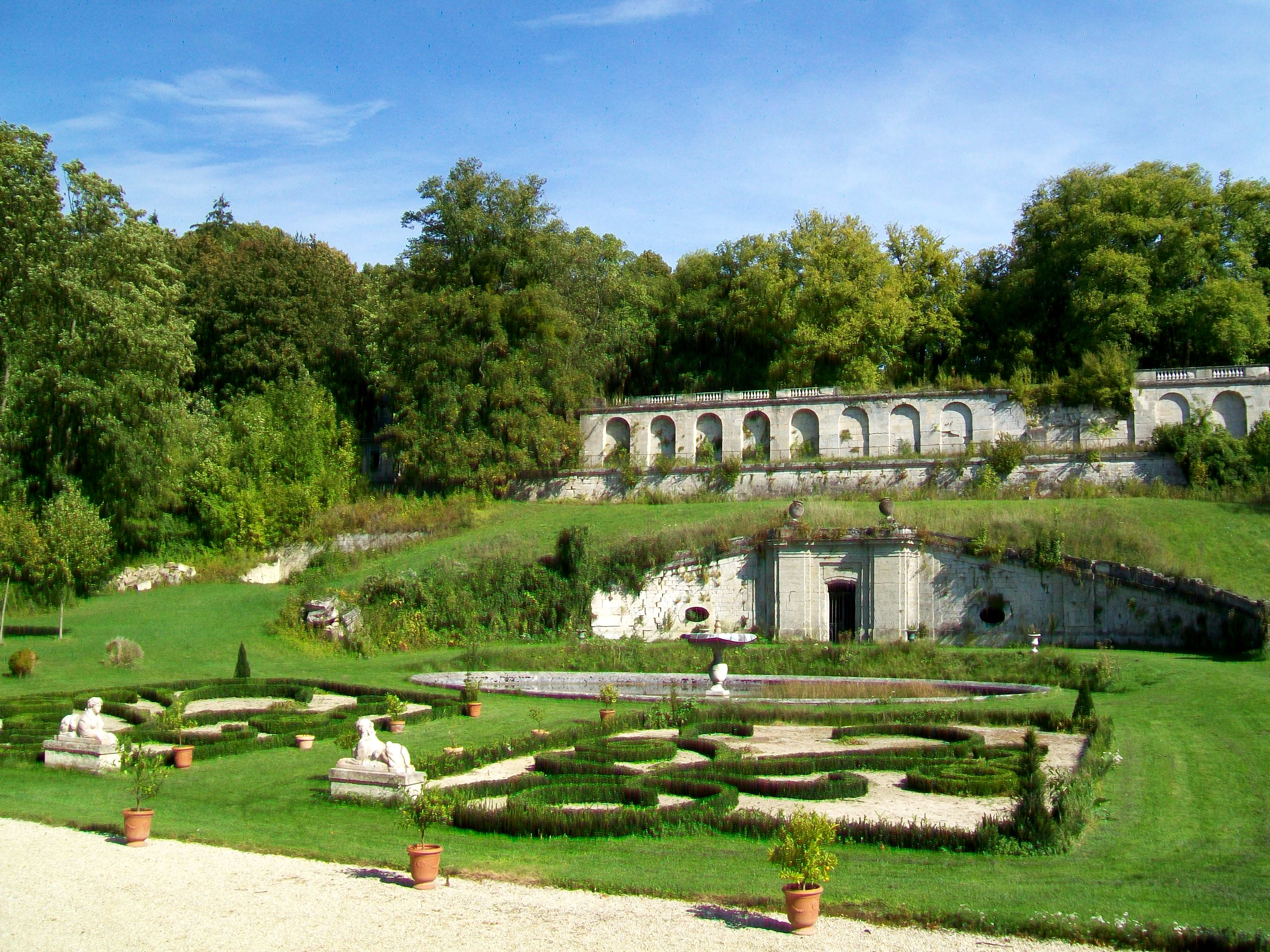
The parterres and the two terraces.

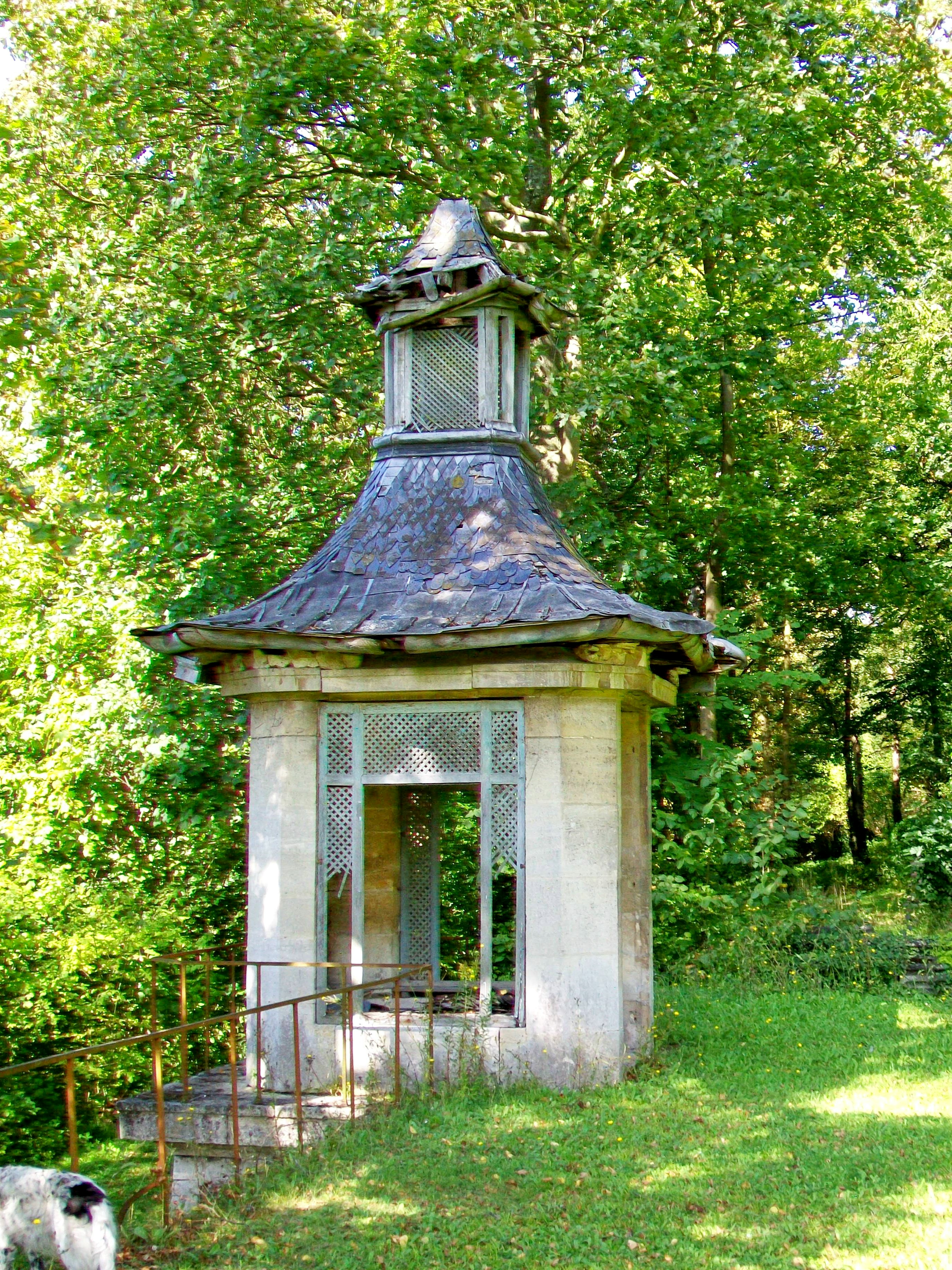
The small Chinese pavilion to the north.

== Bibliography (in French) ==
- Danis, Claude (2002). Châteaux et manoirs en Val-d'Oise. Éditions du Valhermeil. pp. 124–130. ISBN 9782913328327.
- René Botto, Stéphane Gasser and Christophe Gicquelay, « Le patrimoine des communes du Val-d’Oise : L'Isle-Adam », Collection Le Patrimoine des Communes de France, Paris, Flohic Éditions, vol. I, October 1999, p. 414–416 (ISBN 2-84234-056-6)
- Israël, Alain; Gueffier, Françoise; Tranchard, Thierry (2003). Stors - Une histoire de château. Nesles-la-Vallée: Val-d'Oise éditions. ISBN 9782913394155.
- Gabrielle Joudiou, « L'architecte Contant d'Ivry à L'Isle-Adam et Stors », Les Trésors des princes de Bourbon-Conti, Paris / L'Isle-Adam, Somogy éditions d'art / L'Isle-Adam, musée d'art et d'histoire Louis-Senlecq, 2000, p. 107–111 (ISBN 2-85056-398-6)

== External links (in French) ==
- Château de Stors – site officiel
