= This Is Not a Story =

1772 story by Denis Diderot

This Is Not a Story (Note: Or This Is Not Just a Story; French: Ceci n'est pas un conte) is a story by the French author Denis Diderot written in 1772.

== The three Moral Stories ==
This Is Not a Story, Madame de La Carlière and the Supplément au voyage de Bougainville together make up a trilogy of moral stories written in 1772 that partially appeared in the Correspondance littéraire in 1773.

The intention of Diderot himself was for the three stories to be considered together: "le troisième conte donnera son sens aux deux premiers" (the third story will give meaning to the first two), he tells the reader. This intention is confirmed by the initial title of Madame de La Carlière, Second conte (French for Second story), and by the allusions to characters or developments of one of the stories in another. Subsequently, though, the editors did not respect this material and intellectual unity and the texts were edited separately. Jacques-André Naigeon himself published the three texts in his edition of the complete works of Diderot (1796), but separated the Supplément au voyage de Bougainville from the two other texts.

It seems coherent to consider les Deux Amis de Bourbonne, another short story by Diderot, in the same vein as these three stories: the piece takes place during the same era and the themes and the style are similar.

== Summary ==
There are two different stories in This Is Not a Story:

The first recounts the story of Tanié, who is in love with a venal and greedy woman, Madame Reymer. Tanié goes off to Saint-Domingue for ten years to make a fortune for her. Madame Reymer takes advantage of his absence and finds other lovers. When Tanié comes back from his voyage, he lives with Madame Reymer for around five years. Then, Monsieur de Maurepas proposes that he leave to do business with the North, which Tanié accepts to take on because he knows that Madame Reymer is only with him for his fortune. He dies of a fever some days after he departs.

In the second story, Diderot recounts the history of Gardeil and Mademoiselle de la Chaux. Out of love for him, Mademoiselle de la Chaux abandons all—her honor, her fortune, her family—to be with Gardeil. Somehow or other, they live happily. Gardeil, a translator by trade, works until he is no longer able. His wife helps him by learning Greek, Hebrew, and other languages. She gives herself, body and soul, to make him happy, but one day he leaves her because she is no longer useful to him. She takes it very badly, but recovers some years later. She enrolls in the Académie des Inscriptions et Belles-Lettres and then writes a book (Les Trois Favorites, French for The Three Favorites), which she sends to the Marquise de Pompadour, a fervent admirer of good prose. She is invited to Versailles, but rejects this meeting and never ends up going. She ends her life in misery.

Diderot concludes his book in saying that to judge someone based on one single character trait is going a bit fast, but that there is a lot of truth in generalities.

== Bibliography ==
=== The Three Stories ===
- Christiane Frémont, Stanford French Review, (ISSN 0016-1128), 1988, vol. 12, n° 2–3, p. 245-264.
- Michel Delon, introductory note in the edition of Les Œuvres of Diderot found in the bibliothèque de la Pléiade
- Valérie André, Féeries, 3, Politique du conte, 2006, online from 4 May 2007; url: http://feeries.revues.org/document149.html. Accessed 2 July 2008.

=== Ceci n'est pas un conte ===
- The complete text at Project Gutenberg: Ceci n'est pas un conte (in French original) and This Is Not a Story (in English translation).
