= Courtesan at her Mirror =

1657 painting by Rembrandt

Young woman with earrings
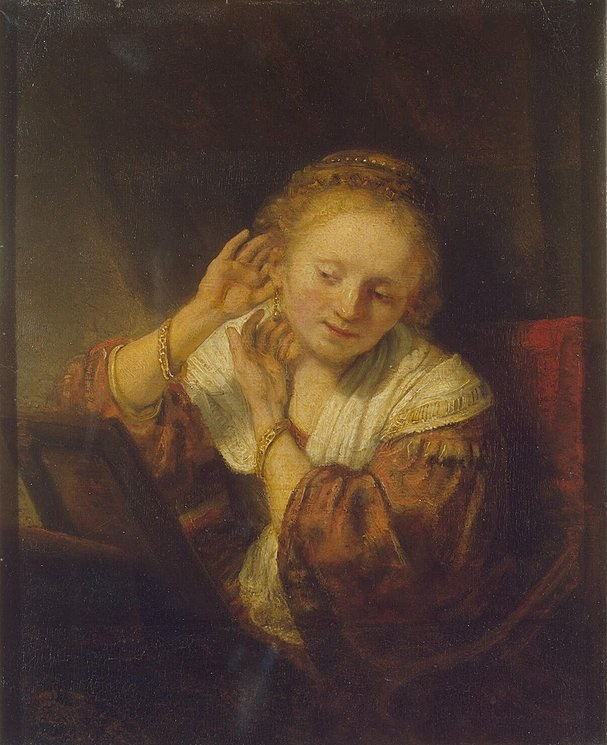
- Artist: Rembrandt
- Year: 1657
- Dimensions: 39.5 cm (15.6 in) × 32.5 cm (12.8 in)
- Location: Hermitage Museum

Courtesan at her Mirror or Young Woman with Earrings is a 1657 painting by Rembrandt. In 1781 it and 118 other works were sold by the Paris-based collector Sylvain-Raphaël de Baudouin to Catherine II of Russia via Melchior Grimm. It is now in the Hermitage Museum.

== See also ==
- List of paintings by Rembrandt

== Sources ==
- https://www.hermitagemuseum.org/wps/portal/hermitage/digital-collection/01.+Paintings/43544/
