= Parfilage =

18th century pastime at the Versaille Palace

Parfilage ([paʁ.fi.laʒ], "unravelling") was a fashionable pastime among women at the Versailles in the 1760s and 1770s. While most forms of ladies' handwork involved making something, parfilage was the opposite: women spent their time unraveling gold and silver braid, lace, or epaulets. As the fad grew – Grimm's Correspondence littéraire referred to a "furor" for it in winter 1773 – ornaments were made and sold solely for the purpose of being unmade. Ladies carried small sacks with them for the gold and silver threads they had salvaged. Taken to a goldsmith, the threads could be melted down and made into bullion. In Britain, parfilage was sometimes known as "drizzling."
