= Marie Charlotte Hippolyte de Saujon =

- Countess of Boufflers
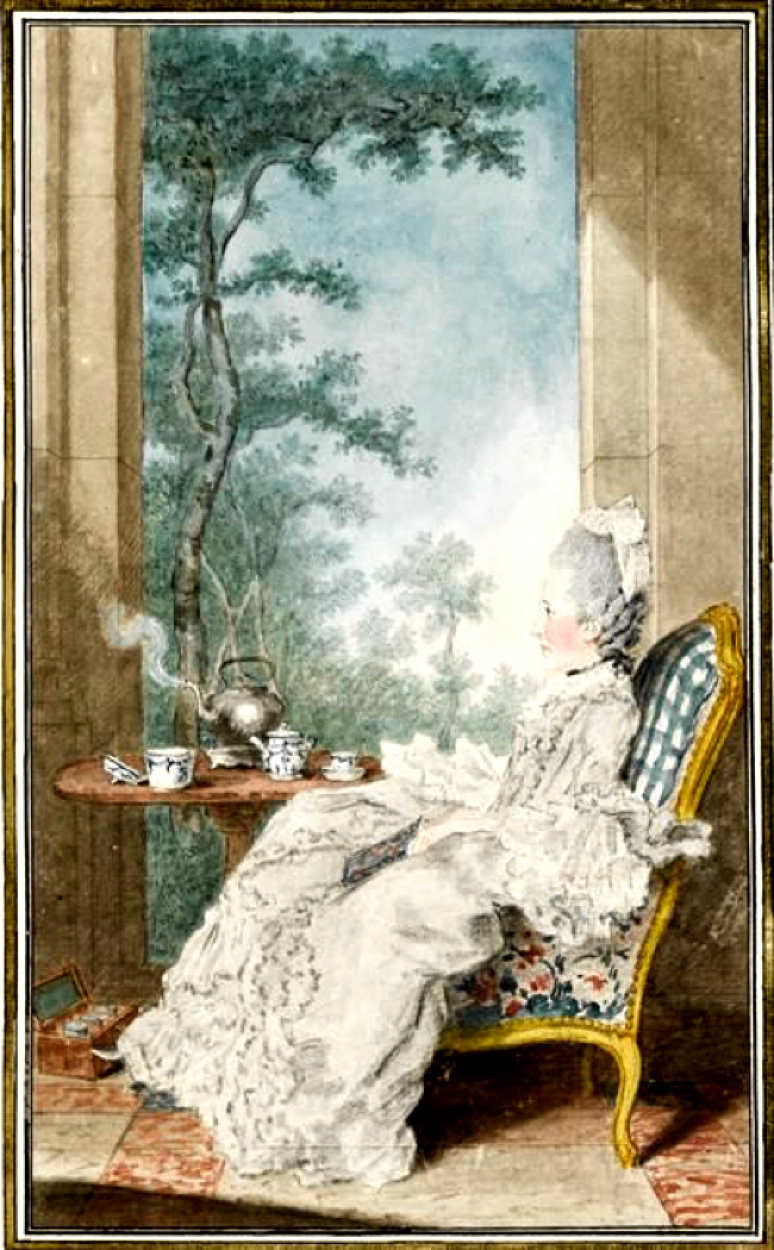
- Portrait of Marie Charlotte de Boufflers, in a circa 1760 Louis Carmontelle portrait Musée Condé.
- Full name: Marie Charlotte Hippolyte de Saujon
- Born: 6 September 1725; Rouen, France
- Died: 28 November 1800 (aged 75); Rouen, France
- Spouses: Édouard de Boufflers, Count of Boufflers (15 February 1746)
- Issue: Louis Édouard, Count of Boufflers
- Father: Charles François de Saujon, Baron of La Rivière
- Mother: Louise Angélique de Barberin

Marie Charlotte Hippolyte de Saujon, by marriage Countess of Boufflers (6 September 1725 – 1800), was a French femme de lettres and salon hostess. Nicknamed "l'idole" by Madame du Deffand, she was a lady in waiting to the Duchess of Chartres and a mistress of Chartres' brother, the 6th Prince of Conti.

== Life ==
Marie Charlotte Hippolyte de Saujon was born in Rouen, the daughter of Charles François de Saujon, Baron of La Rivère, and Louis-Angélique de Barberin de Reignac. She married Comte Édouard de Boufflers, Count of Boufflers a cavalry captain in the régiment de Bellefonds, on 15 February 1746. They had one child, Louis-Édouard de Boufflers, Count of Boufflers (1746–1795). Shortly after her marriage, she became lady in waiting to the Duchess of Chartres. At the Palais-Royal, she got to know the duchess' brother, the 6th Prince of Conti, and soon became his mistress.

After an argument with the powerful Orléans family, she installed herself at a small hôtel particulier in enclos du Temple, next to the palace of the Grand Prior. Until 1789, she held a salon there, the main focus of Paris' then Anglomania. She received Encyclopédistes like Denis Diderot, David Hume, Grimm, Jean-Jacques Rousseau, the abbé Prévost, the abbé Morellet, and Beaumarchais. Surrounded and fêted by learned society, Madame du Deffand nicknamed her "l'idole". Under the influence of the Encyclopédistes, the countess became author of some works of literature and light poetry.

In 1763, she went to London during the peace negotiations to accompany the wife of the French ambassador, Madame d'Usson. There she was fêted once again and met Samuel Johnson and Horace Walpole, who she received in Paris and at the Château de Stors, granted to her by the Prince de Conti after the death of Mme Panneau d'Arty in 1765.

She ignored Versailles, first going there in 1750 on the death of her father-in-law, and was only officially presented there in 1770, by her then lover the Maréchale de Luxembourg (1707–1787).

On her husband's death in October 1764, she hoped to marry her lover Louis François, 6th Prince de Conti but in the end had to give up this dream due to his lack of interest.

In 1773, the Comtesse de Boufflers bought a country house at Auteuil to which she retired on the death of the Prince de Conti in 1776. The old Temple circle met until 1789. She acted as an agent for King Gustav III of Sweden. According to tradition she arranged the 1786 marriage between Germaine Necker and the Swedish ambassador Erik Magnus Staël von Holstein (Baron de Staël).

Among her houses was the Château de La Rivière à Fronsac (which was sold it in 1794).

On 7 July 1794 the 70-years-old was arrested in the height of the Reign of Terror together with many other nobles, but acquitted after the trial in September (1 Vendémiaire).

She wrote several poems and works of literature:

Her son Louis-Édouard de Boufflers-Rouverel (1746–1795) married Amelie Constance des Alleurs.
