= Madame de La Carlière =

Madame de La Carlière, sub-titled On the inconsequence of public judgement of our actions, is a fable written by the French writer Denis Diderot in 1772, and published for the first time in 1798. It was published posthumously, as Diderot had died in 1784.

Preceded by This is not a fable and followed by Supplement to the Voyage of Bougaineville, it forms a triptych of moral fables written in 1772 that would appear in the Literary Correspondence in 1773.

Madame de La Carlière takes its name from the mother of Sophie Volland, Élisabeth Françoise Brunel de La Carlière.

In 1988, Madame de La Carlière was performed as a stage piece alongside Diderot's novel Rameau's Nephew at New York University, as part of a celebration commemorating the 200th anniversary of the French Revolution and the Declaration of the Rights of Man and of the Citizen.

== Bibliography ==
- Laffitte M., Diderot : hésitations autour de la promesse (Histoire de Madame de la Carlière). In : Revue romane (ISSN 0035-3906), 1992, vol. 27, n°1, p. 90-103.
