= Béthemont-la-Forêt =

- Commune
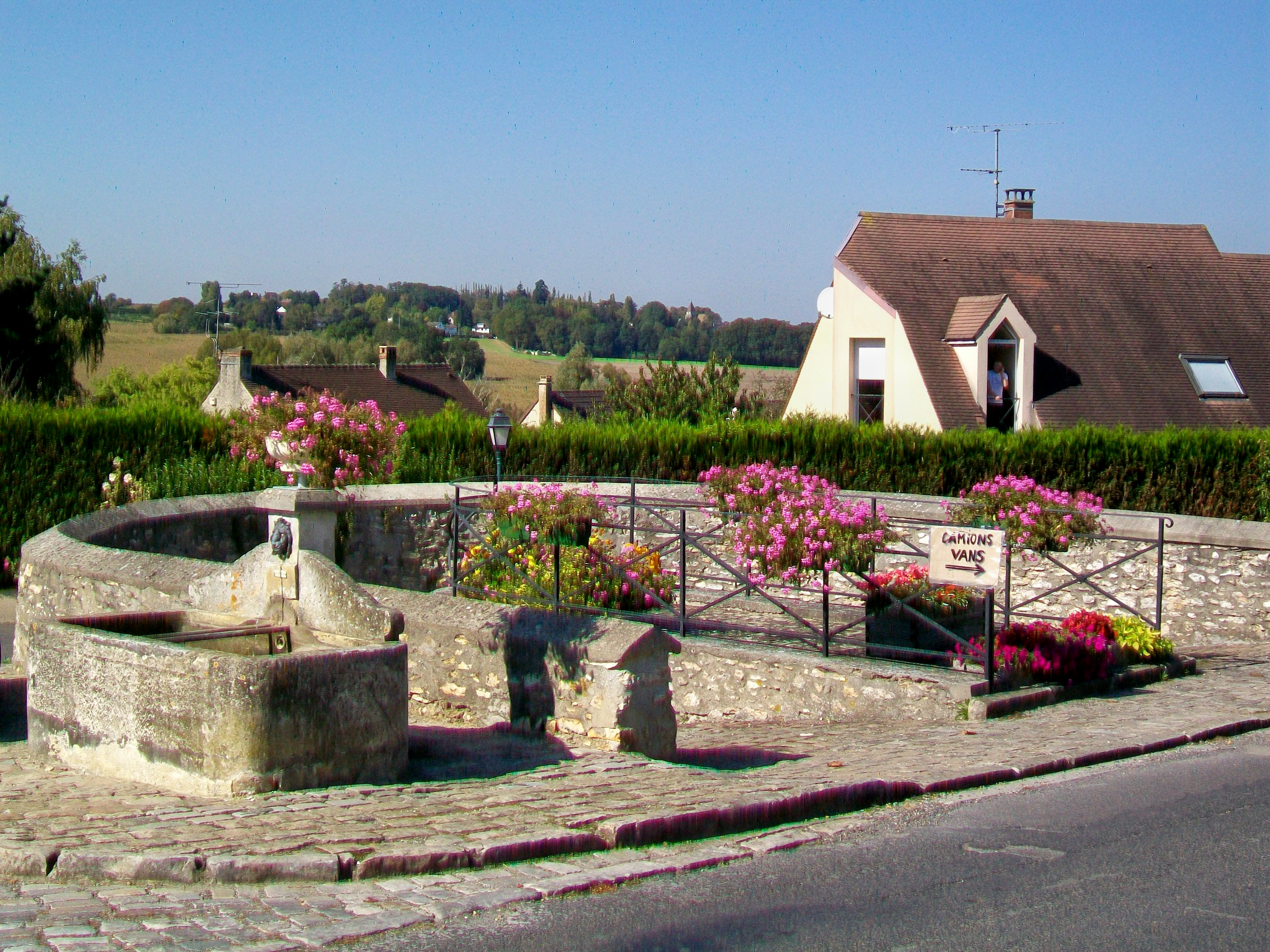
- The fountain in Béthemont-la-Forêt

- Coat of arms
- Location of Béthemont-la-Forêt
- Location within France Location within Île-de-France (region)
- Coordinates: 49°03′19″N 2°15′11″E
- Country: France
- Region: Île-de-France
- Department: Val-d'Oise
- Arrondissement: Pontoise
- Canton: Domont
- Intercommunality: Vallée de l'Oise et des Trois Forêts

Government
  - Mayor (2020–2026): Didier Dagonet
- Area^{1}: 3.79 km^{2} (1.46 sq mi)
- Highest elevation: 194 m (636 ft)
- Lowest elevation: 79 m (259 ft)
- Population (2023): 435
  - Density: 115/km^{2} (297/sq mi)
- Time zone: UTC+01:00 (CET)
  - Summer (DST): UTC+02:00 (CEST)
- INSEE/Postal code: 95061 /95840
- ^{1} French Land Register data, which excludes lakes, ponds, glaciers > 1 km^{2} (0.386 sq mi or 247 acres) and river estuaries.

Béthemont-la-Forêt (French pronunciation: [betmɔ̃ la fɔʁɛ]) is a commune in the Val-d'Oise department in Île-de-France in northern France.

== See also ==
- Communes of the Val-d'Oise department
