= Maurice Tourneux =

French man of letters and bibliographer (1849–1917)

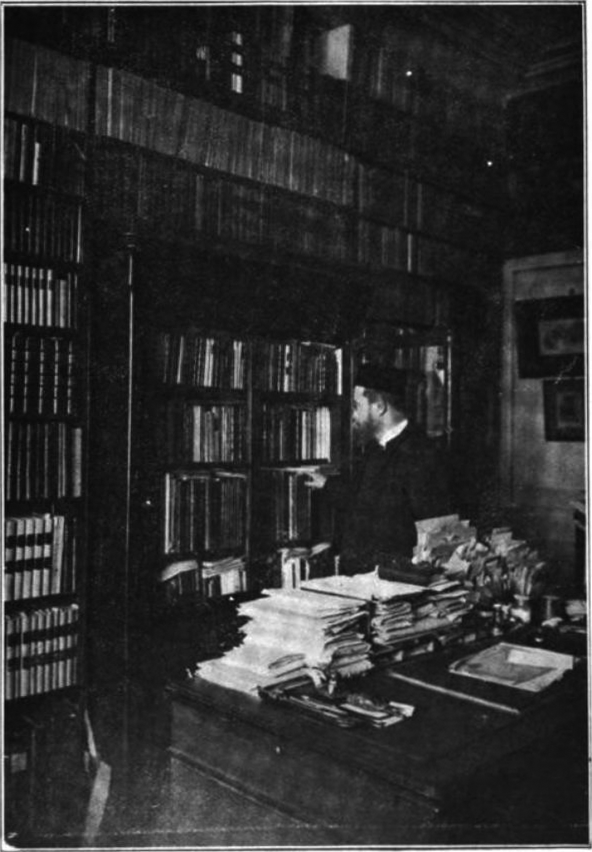
Jean-Maurice Tourneux in his library

Maurice Tourneux (12 July 1849 – 13 January 1917) was a French man of letters and bibliographer.

== Life ==
The son of the artist and author J.F.E. Tourneux, he was born in Paris.

He began his career as a bibliographer by collaborating in new editions of the Supercheries littéraires of Joseph Quérard and the Dictionnaire des anonymes of Antoine Barbier. His most important bibliographical work was the Bibliographie de l'histoire de Paris pendant la Révolution française (3 vols. 1890–1901), which was crowned by the Academy of Inscriptions. This valuable work serves as a guide for the history of the city beyond the limits of the Revolution.

His other works include bibliographies of Prosper Mérimée (1876), of Théophile Gautier (1876), of the brothers de Goncourt (1897) and others; also editions of FM Grimm's Correspondance littéraire, of Diderot's Neveu de Rameau (1884), of Montesquieu's Lettres persanes (Persian Letters, 1886), etc.
