= Louis-Charles Boileau =

French architect

Louis-Charles Boileau (French pronunciation: [lwi ʃaʁl bwalo]; 1837 - 1914) was a French architect.

He was the son of French architect Louis-Auguste Boileau and the father of French architect Louis-Hippolyte Boileau.. Louis-Charles Boileau was a partner in the design of an extension of Le Bon Marché department store in Paris, France.
