= Chauvry =

- Commune
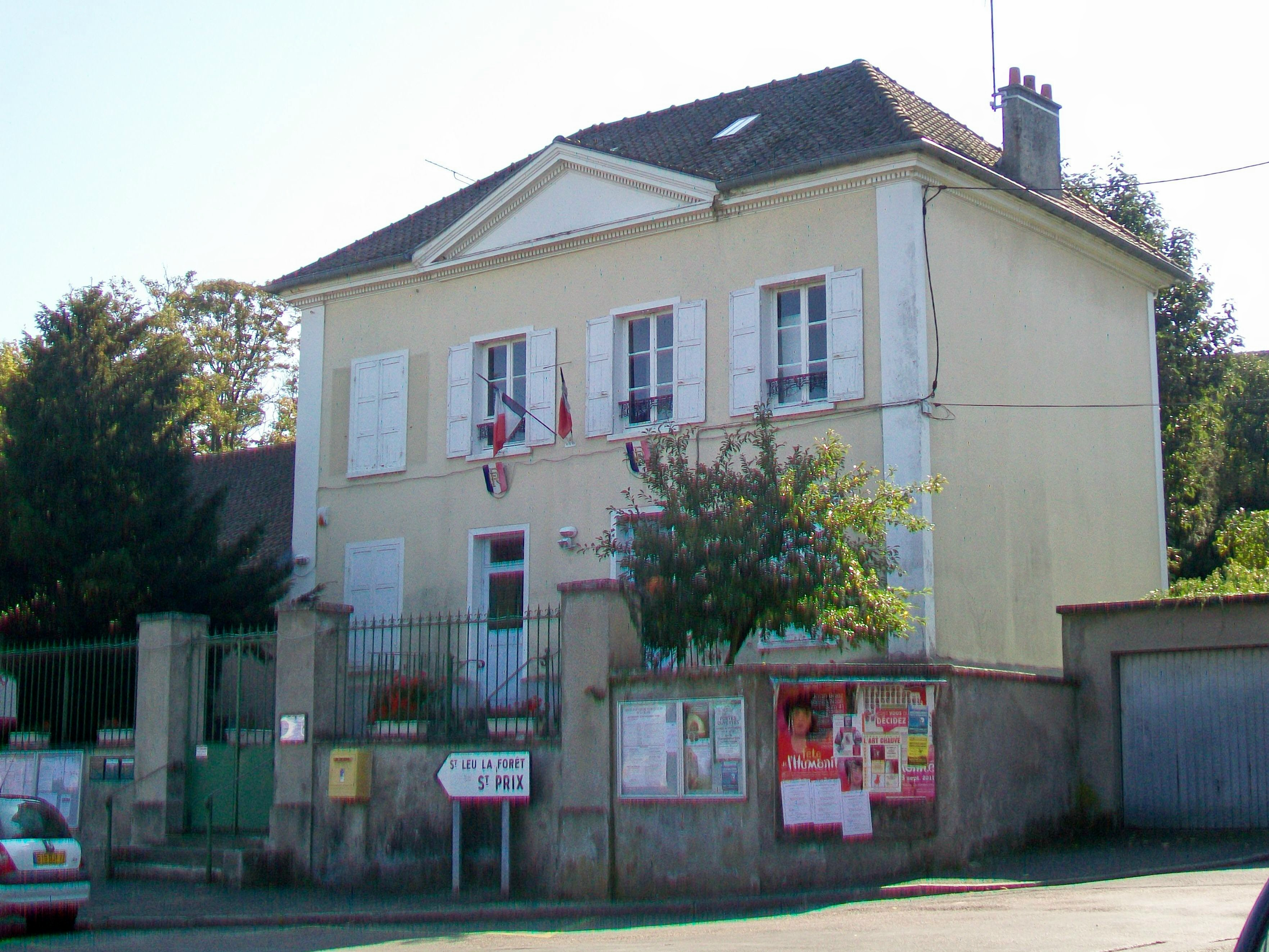
- The town hall of Chauvry
- Location of Chauvry
- Location within France Location within Île-de-France (region)
- Coordinates: 49°03′17″N 2°16′05″E
- Country: France
- Region: Île-de-France
- Department: Val-d'Oise
- Arrondissement: Pontoise
- Canton: Domont
- Intercommunality: Vallée de l'Oise et des Trois Forêts

Government
  - Mayor (2020–2026): Jacques Delaune
- Area^{1}: 5.00 km^{2} (1.93 sq mi)
- Highest elevation: 194 m (636 ft)
- Lowest elevation: 81 m (266 ft)
- Population (2023): 297
  - Density: 59.4/km^{2} (154/sq mi)
- Time zone: UTC+01:00 (CET)
  - Summer (DST): UTC+02:00 (CEST)
- INSEE/Postal code: 95151 /95560
- ^{1} French Land Register data, which excludes lakes, ponds, glaciers > 1 km^{2} (0.386 sq mi or 247 acres) and river estuaries.

Chauvry (French pronunciation: [ʃovʁi]) is a commune in the Val-d'Oise department in Île-de-France in northern France.

== See also ==
- Communes of the Val-d'Oise department
