= Marie-Anne-Louise Fontaine =

Marie Anne Louise Guillaume de Fontaine (25 August 1710 – March 1765) was a French noblewoman, known after her marriage as Madame Panneau d'Arty.

== Life ==
She was one of the three illegitimate children of banker Samuel Bernard and Marie-Anne-Armande Carton (1684–1745), known as Manon, daughter of actor Florent Carton Dancourt. In his Confessions, Jean-Jacques Rousseau described the three as:

three sisters that could be called the three graces : Madame de la Touche, who had an adventure in England with the Duke of Kingston; Madame d'Arty, the mistress and what is more the only and sincere friend of the Prince of Conty, an adorable woman as much for her softness and the kindness of her charming character as for the kindness of her charming character, the pleasantness of her wit, and the unalterable cheerfulness of her disposition; finally, Madame Dupin, the most beautiful of the three.

On 16 October 1724 in the church of Notre-Dame-de-Grace de Passy, aged fourteen, she married Antoine Alexis Panneau d'Arty, director general of assistance from 1737 to 1743. In 1737 she began a long relationship with Louis François de Bourbon-Conti and this became public from 1740 onwards. He bought the château de Stors in 1746 to house her. There she met with many intimate friends such as Louise d'Épinay, as well as withdrawing there when she argued with Conti, which according to the marquis d'Argenson's diary was often:

the prince of Conty reconciled then quarrelled then reconciled with his mistress, lady Darty. They quarrel at meals, at L'Isle-Adam, in front of everyone. The prince struck the lady; she hit him on the cheek, he bled; when he saw his blood, he became furious like a lion. Everyone withdrew; he was only left with a single servant who the prince ordered to throw the lady out of the windows; this valet dragged her by the hair, she was locked in her bedroom, where she was only given bread and water. She escaped through a window! She entrusted all her possessions to the Prince, her lover; he did not pay her; she quarrelled with her husband. Since then she has reconciled with the Prince. A ridiculous story.

Madame Panneau d'Arty allowed the Prince to manage her fortune, which he quickly squandered. They broke up in 1750, but Madame d'Arty retained the use of the Stors estate, to which she retired and lived a devout life.

== Bibliography (in French) ==
- Ranjard, Robert (8 June 1976) [1950]. Le secret de Chenonceau. Tours: Éditions Gibert-Clarey. p. 177 à 210. BnF 41676433m.
- Robert Ranjard, Le secret de Chenonceau, Tours, Éditions Gibert-Clarey, 8 June 1976 (1st edition 1950), 256 p. (BNF 41676433), « Monsieur et madame Dupin », p. 177 - 210.
- Gaston de Villeneuve-Guibert, Le portefeuille de madame Dupin : Dame de Chenonceaux, Paris, Éditions Calmann-Lévy, 20 January 1884
- Gustave Desnoiresterres, Épicuriens et lettrés : XVIIe et XVIIIe siècles, Paris, Éditions Georges Charpentier, 1879, « Enfants Fontaine », p. 440 - 447.
