= Supplément au voyage de Bougainville =

Book by Denis Diderot

Supplément au voyage de Bougainville, ou dialogue entre A et B sur l'inconvénient d'attacher des idées morales à certaines actions physiques qui n'en comportent pas. ("Addendum to the Journey of Bougainville, or dialogue between A and B on the drawback to binding moral ideas to certain physical actions which bear none") is a set of philosophical dialogues written by Denis Diderot, inspired by Louis Antoine de Bougainville's Voyage autour du monde. It was written in 1772 for the journal Correspondance littéraire, which commissioned him to review Bougainville's account of his travels, but not published until 1796. The work was published posthumously, as Diderot had died in 1784.

== Background ==
Bougainville, a contemporary of Diderot, was a French explorer whose 1771 book Voyage autour du monde (A Voyage Around the World) provided an account of an expedition that took him to Argentina, Patagonia, Indonesia, and Tahiti. It was the utopian descriptions of the latter that inspired Diderot to write his review in the form of a fictional Supplement.

== Structure ==
The Supplement spans either four or five chapters, depending on the edition. Each takes the form of a dialogue between two people, but the characters and setting varies. Chapter two features a Tahitian Elder addressing a hypothetical Bougainville; chapters three and four are between a villager named Orou and his European almoner guest; in chapters one and five, speakers known only as "A" and "B" speak in a literary space apart from Tahiti, commenting on and drawing lessons from the noted differences between Tahitian and European culture.

In each of the dialogues, Diderot aligns one character with European culture and the other with Tahitian culture for the purpose of contrasting the two. This kind of nature–culture divide was a common strategy to critique aspects of European culture during the Enlightenment.

=== Theme of sexuality in Supplément au Voyage de Bougainville ===
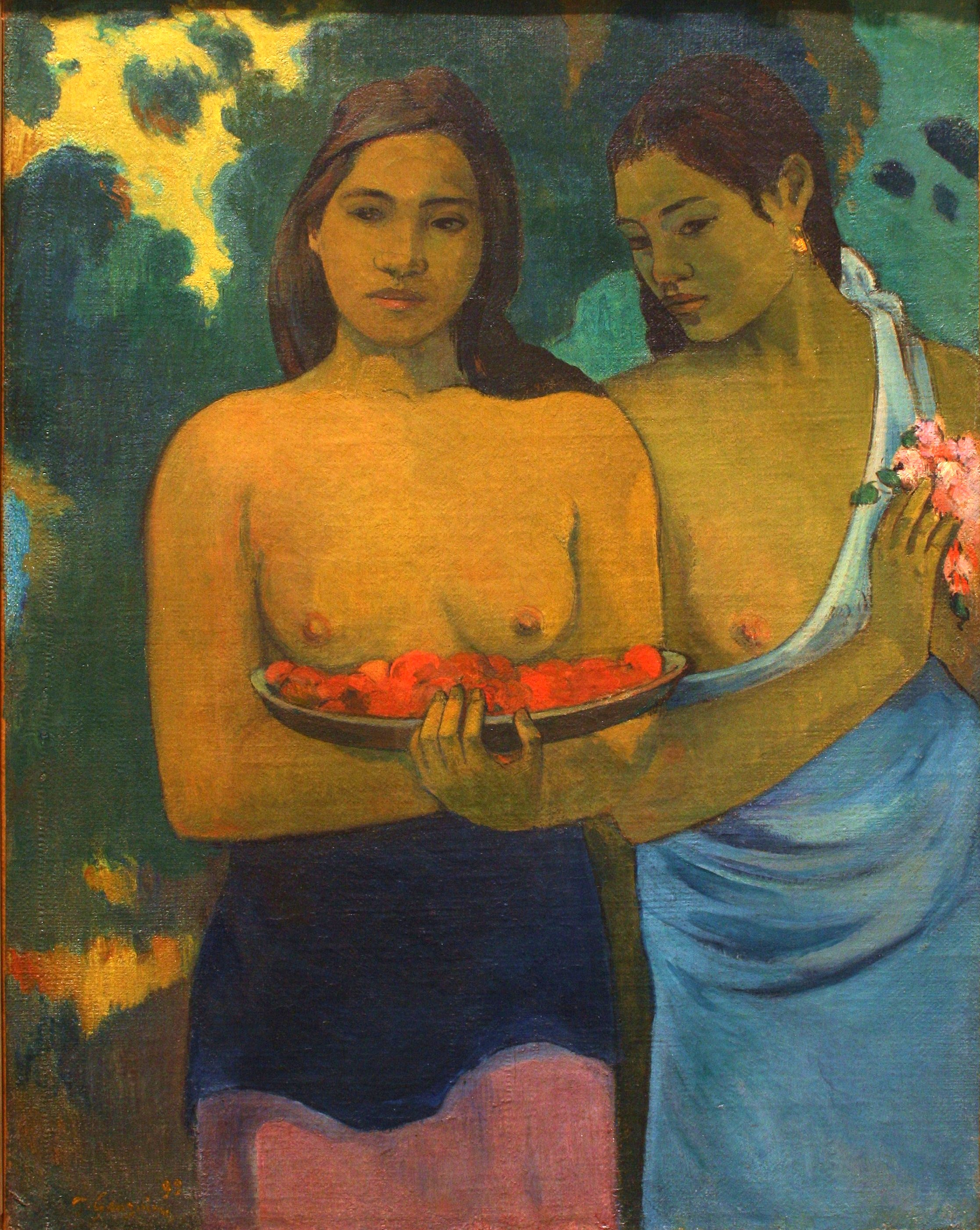
Two Tahitian Women, 1899, Paul Gauguin

==== Origins ====
Because of his study of nature and the advancements in life sciences, Denis Diderot came to the conclusion that universal progress depends largely on Eros. For Diderot, Eros is "a priori existence of sexual energy that fuels the universe." This concept greatly influenced Diderot's views on human sexuality. His involvement in Enlightenment movements such as sensualism, vitalism and materialism also helped him to develop his ideas about human sexuality. He believed that nature had a moral end and encourages humans to have children. Since nature favors procreation, laws and rules should not restrain the sexuality of men and women. Since 18th century French society had many rules controlling people's sexuality, Diderot believed that French society is not a suitable place for Eros because of its "artificiality and formalism." For Claudia Moscovici, Diderot's critique of 18th century French society, especially its rules controlling human sexuality, can especially be seen in the Supplément au Voyage de Bougainville.

==== Diderot's views on sexuality ====
Diderot's views on sexuality are contained in the Supplément au Voyage de Bougainville. In the book, Diderot uses a dialogue between Orou, a Tahitian man, and a chaplain in order to contrast the French and Tahitian societies. Tahitian people are governed by nature and portrayed as happy and content. They also have fewer restrictions on their sexual conduct because men and women are not obligated to marry before having a child together. People can have sex with the opposite gender in order to procreate, which is nature's intended purpose for humans. In Tahiti, women are not considered property of any man and are not ridiculed for having a child before marriage. Claudia Moscovici argues that Diderot uses the Tahitian society to criticize the laws and norms regarding sexual behavior in 18th century French society and Western culture. Unlike the Tahitians, the French are governed by laws and convention. They had more restrictions on the sexual behavior of men and women. For instance, it was unacceptable to have a child with someone without being married in French society. Once married, family life for women was very constraining. French women did not have much freedom to pursue jobs outside the home and were considered the property of their husband. In this way, Claudia Moscovici argues that Diderot believed that marriage controlled human sexuality because women and men were bound to one another, prohibiting them from having children with others. For Alice Parker, Diderot also believed this idea because French women were no longer free to satisfy their own desires, especially sexual ones, and had to adhere to the commands of their "bourgeois patriarchs."

==== Diderot's contradictory views ====
Walter E. Rex has suggested that Diderot's claim in Supplément au Voyage de Bougainville that women should not be the property of men is contradicted by the letter that he writes to Angélique, his daughter, on her wedding day. Here, discussing how his daughter should act once married, Diderot asserts that a wife should obey and give pleasure to her husband, respect him at all times, and keep him entertained in order to guarantee that he will not leave her; Diderot even says that her whole existence is to ensure that her husband is satisfied. The submission that Diderot enjoins is contrary to the liberation displayed in the Tahitian lifestyle in Supplément au Voyage de Bougainville. a sign perhaps of his uncertainty regarding the extent to which it can serve as a model for imitation in present-day European society.
