= Friedrich Melchior, Baron von Grimm =

German journalist, art critic, and diplomat (1723–1807)

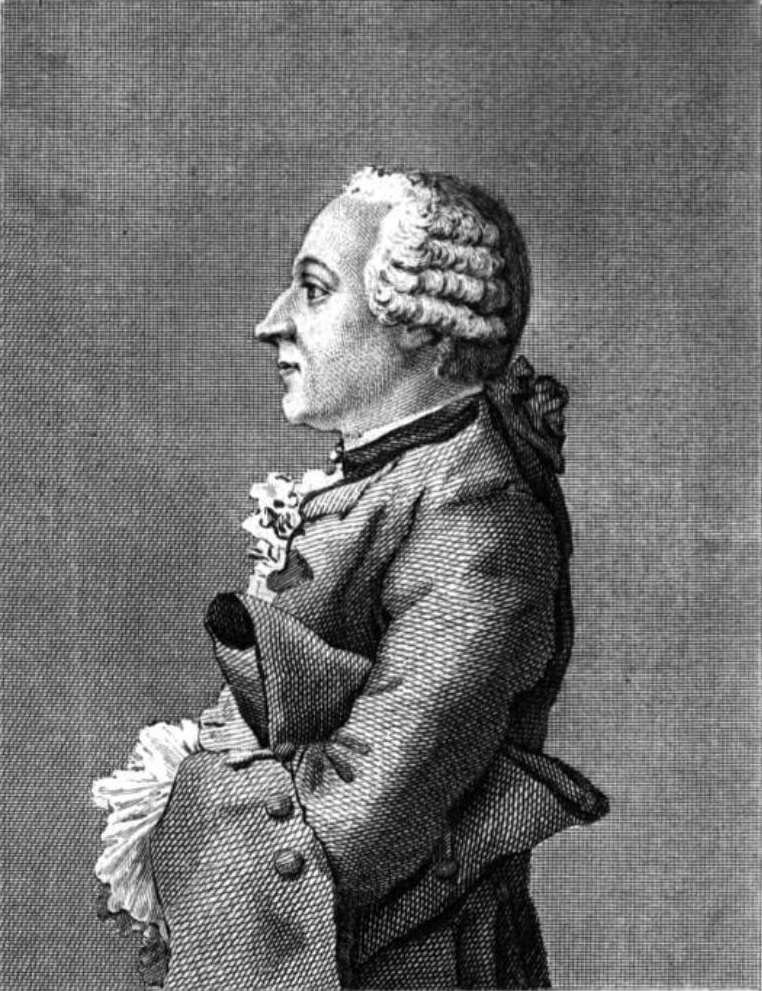
Baron Friedrich Melchior von Grimm (1769), engraved by John Swaine

Friedrich Melchior, Baron von Grimm (26 September 1723 – 19 December 1807) was a German-born French-language journalist, art critic, diplomat and contributor to the Encyclopédie ou Dictionnaire raisonné des sciences, des arts et des métiers. In 1765 Grimm wrote Poème lyrique, an influential article for the Encyclopédie on lyric and opera librettos. Like Christoph Willibald Gluck and Ranieri de' Calzabigi, Grimm became interested in opera reform. According to Martin Fontius, a German literary theorist, "sooner or later a book entitled The Aesthetic Ideas of Grimm will have to be written."

== Early years ==
Grimm was born at Regensburg, the son of Johann Melchior Grimm (1682–1749), a pastor, and Sibylle Margarete Grimm (née Koch) (1684–1774). He studied theology and law at the University of Leipzig, where he came under the influence of Johann Christoph Gottsched and of Johann August Ernesti, to whom he was largely indebted for his critical appreciation of classical literature. When nineteen, he produced a tragedy, Banise, which met with some success. After two years of studying literature and philosophy, he returned to his hometown, where he was attached to the household of Count Johann Friedrich von Schönberg. In 1749, he accompanied his friend Gottlob Ludwig von Schönberg, and his pupil, the younger brother to Paris. There, Count August Heinrich von Friesen (1727–1755) appointed him as his secretary. Jean-Jacques Rousseau wrote in his Confessions that Grimm played a cembalo and acted also as reader to Frederick Louis, the eldest son of Frederick III, Duke of Saxe-Gotha-Altenburg, the young hereditary prince of Saxe-Gotha.

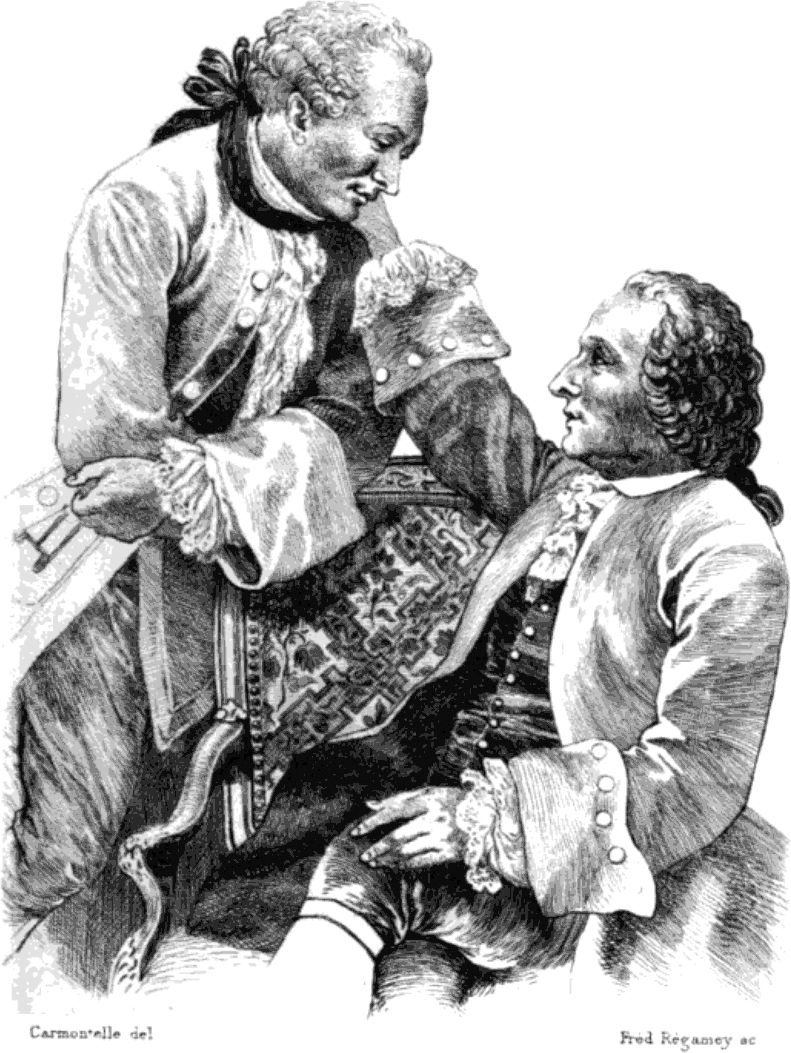
Denis Diderot and Friedrich Melchior Grimm, drawing by Carmontelle

His acquaintance with Rousseau soon ripened into warm friendship, through a mutual sympathy in regard to music and theater, and led to a close association with the Encyclopaedists Diderot, Baron d'Holbach, d'Alembert, Marmontel, Morellet and Helvétius, who were meeting at the salon of Madame Boufflers, Marie-Charlotte Hippolyte de Campet de Saujon. He rapidly obtained a thorough knowledge of the French language and acquired so perfectly the tone and sentiments of the society in which he moved that all marks of his foreign origin and training seemed effaced.

In 1750, he started to write for the Mercure de France on German literature and the ideas of Gottsched. In 1752, at the beginning of the Querelle des Bouffons, he wrote Lettre de M. Grimm sur Omphale. Grimm complained that the text of the libretto had no connection with the music. Grimm and Rousseau became the enemy of Élie Catherine Fréron. In 1753, he wrote a witty pamphlet entitled Le petit prophète de Boehmischbroda, "a parable about a Bohemian boy being sent to Paris to see the lamentable state into which the French opera has descended". This defence of Italian opera established his literary reputation. It is possible that the origin of the pamphlet is partly to be accounted for by his vehement passion for Marie Fel, the prima donna of the Paris Opéra, who was one of the few French singers capable of performing Italian arias. When she refused him —and stayed in relation with Louis de Cahusac— Grimm fell into lethargy. Rousseau and Abbé Raynal took care of him.

== Correspondance littéraire ==
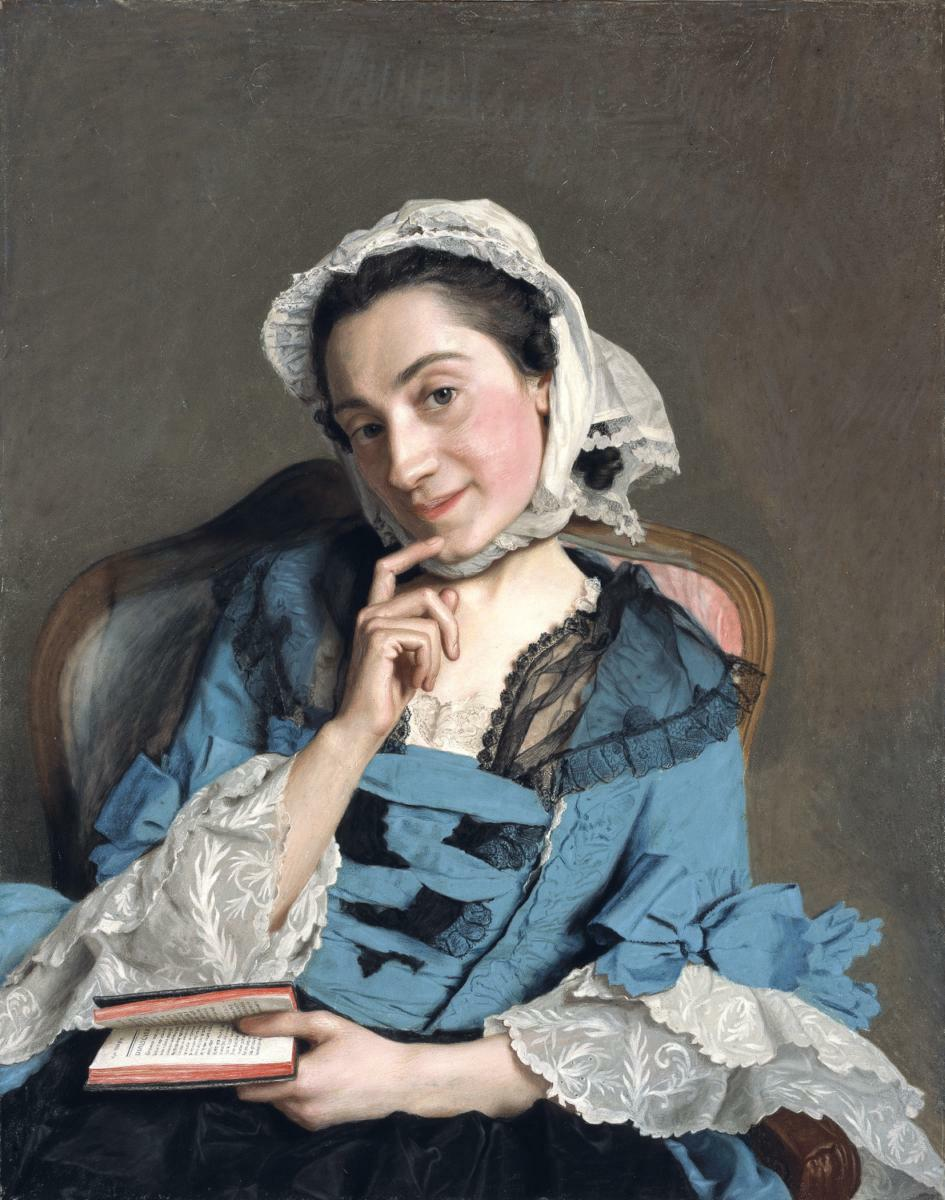
Louise d'Épinay (1726–1783)

In 1753, following the example of Abbé Raynal, and with the latter's encouragement, Grimm began a literary newsletter with various German sovereigns. (Note: Raynal's own letters, Nouvelles littéraires, dispatched to various German courts, keeping the European aristocracy abreast of current cultural developments in Paris, ceased early in 1755.) The first number of the Correspondance littéraire, philosophique et critique was dated 15 May 1753. With the aid of friends, especially of Diderot (Note: Diderot's Madame de La Carlière and Supplément au voyage de Bougainville were first published in the journal Correspondance littéraire.) and Mme d'Épinay, who reviewed many plays, always anonymously, during his temporary absences from France, Grimm himself carried on the Correspondance littéraire, which consisted of two letters a month that were painstakingly copied in manuscript by amanuenses safely apart from the French censor in Zweibrücken, just over the border in the Palatinate.

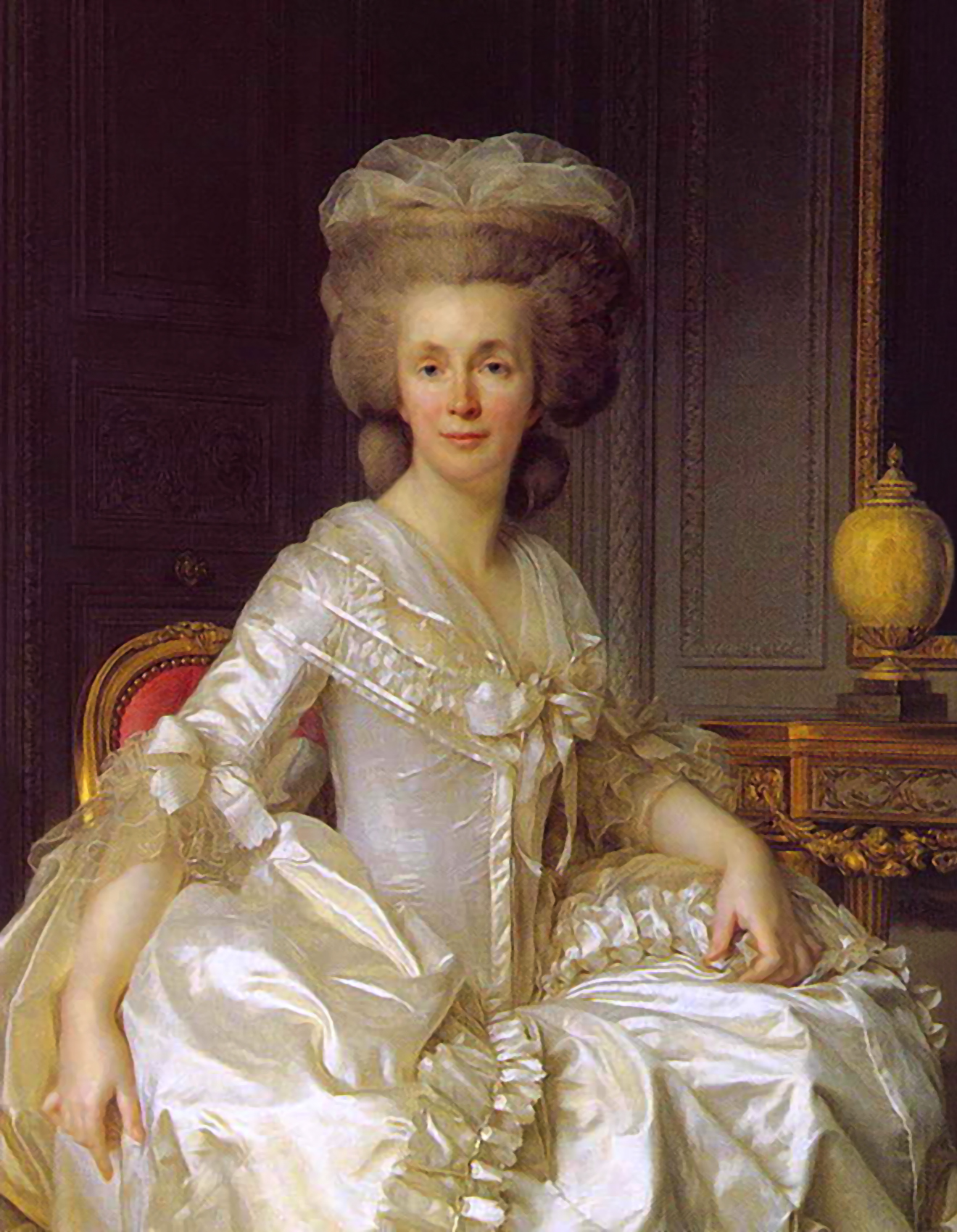
Suzanne Curchod

Eventually, Grimm counted among his 16 (or 25) subscribers: Princess Luise Dorothea of Saxe-Meiningen, Princess Caroline Louise of Hesse-Darmstadt, Princess Louisa Ulrika of Prussia and Queen of Sweden, Prince Henry of Prussia, Catherine II of Russia, Leopold II, Holy Roman Emperor, Gustav III of Sweden, and many princes of the smaller German states, as Charles Frederick, Grand Duke of Baden, Karl August, Grand Duke of Saxe-Weimar-Eisenach, Charles Alexander, Margrave of Brandenburg-Ansbach, William Henry, Prince of Nassau-Saarbrücken, and Frederick Michael, Count Palatine of Zweibrücken. Between 1763 and 1766, Grimm attempted to recruit Prussian king Frederick the Great as a subscriber, his two siblings were already subscribers. Mme Geoffrin, whose Paris salon Grimm frequented, enrolled Stanislas Poniatowski as a subscriber, writing him:

"Here is your first number, together with Grimm's accompanying letter. Your Majesty will see that it is important that no copies be made. The German courts are very loyal to Grimm in this particular. I may even say to Your Majesty that negligence on this point could have serious consequences for me, the matter having passed through my hands."

The correspondence of Grimm was strictly confidential and was not divulged during his lifetime. It embraces nearly the whole period from 1750 to 1790, but the later volumes, 1773 to 1790, were chiefly the work of his secretary, the Swiss Jakob Heinrich Meister (1744–1826), with whom he made acquaintance in the salon of Suzanne Curchod, the wife of Jacques Necker. At first he contented himself with enumerating the chief current views in literature and art and indicating very slightly the contents of the principal new books, but gradually his criticisms became more extended and trenchant, and he touched on nearly every subject — political, literary, artistic, social and religious — that interested the Parisian society of the time. His notices of contemporaries are somewhat severe, and he exhibits the foibles and selfishness of the society in which he moved; but he was unbiased in his literary judgments, and time has only served to confirm his criticisms. In style and manner of expression, he is thoroughly French. He is generally somewhat cold in his appreciation, but his literary taste is delicate and subtle, and it was the opinion of Charles Augustin Sainte-Beuve that the quality of his thought in his best moments will compare not unfavourably even with that of Voltaire. His religious and philosophical opinions were entirely sceptical.

== Content of the Correspondance ==
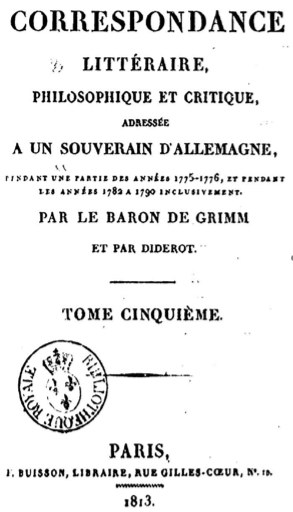
Correspondance littéraire, 1813

For several years, Grimm reported on the painters and paintings in the Salon de Paris, and was successfully succeeded by Diderot; he appreciated the architects Jacques-Germain Soufflot, and Claude-Nicolas Ledoux, the naturalist and mathematician Buffon, the mathematician Leonhard Euler, and the political scientist Condorcet. Grimm asked Diderot to review Voyage autour du monde ("A Voyage Round the World") by Louis Antoine de Bougainville. Grimm had paid attention to the case Jean Calas, the problems between Rousseau and David Hume, the Montgolfier brothers, and Madame de Staël when she published her Letters on the works and character of J.J. Rousseau. The Correspondance became one of the influential media to spread malicious and false information on Rousseau.

Grimm did not appreciate Mondonville's Daphnis et Alcimadure, though he approved the use of the Occitan language, as being closer to Italian; according to Grimm "In Zoroastre it is day and night alternately but as the poet ... cannot count up to five he has got so muddled in his reckoning that he has been compelled to make it be day and night two or three times in each act so that it might be day at the end of the play". He wrote about Caffarelli and about Pierre Beaumarchais. Grimm didn't think much of Antoine de Léris: "The author claims that the public received his work with indulgence. If perfect oblivion may so be called, the author is right to be grateful"; The diminished Correspondance continued without Grimm until the revolutionary year 1790.

== Connections ==
In 1755, after the death of Count von Friesen (1727–1755), who was a nephew of Marshal Maurice de Saxe and an officer in the French army, Grimm secured a sinecure worth 2 000 livres a year as secrétaire des commandements to Marshal d'Estrées on the Westphalia campaign of 1756–1757 during the Seven Years' War. In 1759, he was named envoy of the free-town of Frankfurt am Main to the French court, but was deprived of his office for criticizing Victor François de Broglie, 2nd Duke of Broglie in a dispatch intercepted by Louis XV's secret service.

=== Rousseau ===
In 1751, Grimm was introduced by Rousseau to Madame d'Épinay, with whom he began a 30-year liaison two years later, which led after four years to an irreconcilable rupture between him, Diderot and Rousseau.

Grimm and d'Holbach supported financially the mother of Thérèse Levasseur. Instead of Rousseau, Grimm accompanied Mme. d'Épinay to Geneva to visit doctor Théodore Tronchin. Rousseau believed Grimm had made her pregnant.

Grimm criticized Rousseau's Julie, or the New Heloise and Émile, or On Education. Rousseau was induced by his resentment to give in his Confessions a malicious portrait of Grimm's character. Grimm's betrayals of his closest friend, Diderot, finally led Diderot to bitter denunciations of him too in his Lettre apologétique de l'abbé Raynal à M. Grimm in 1781.

In 1783, Grimm lost Mme Épinay, his most intimate friend, and the following year 1784, died Denis Diderot.

Not long after, he showed Prince Henry of Prussia, on a diplomatic trip, in Paris.

=== Mozart's three visits to Paris ===
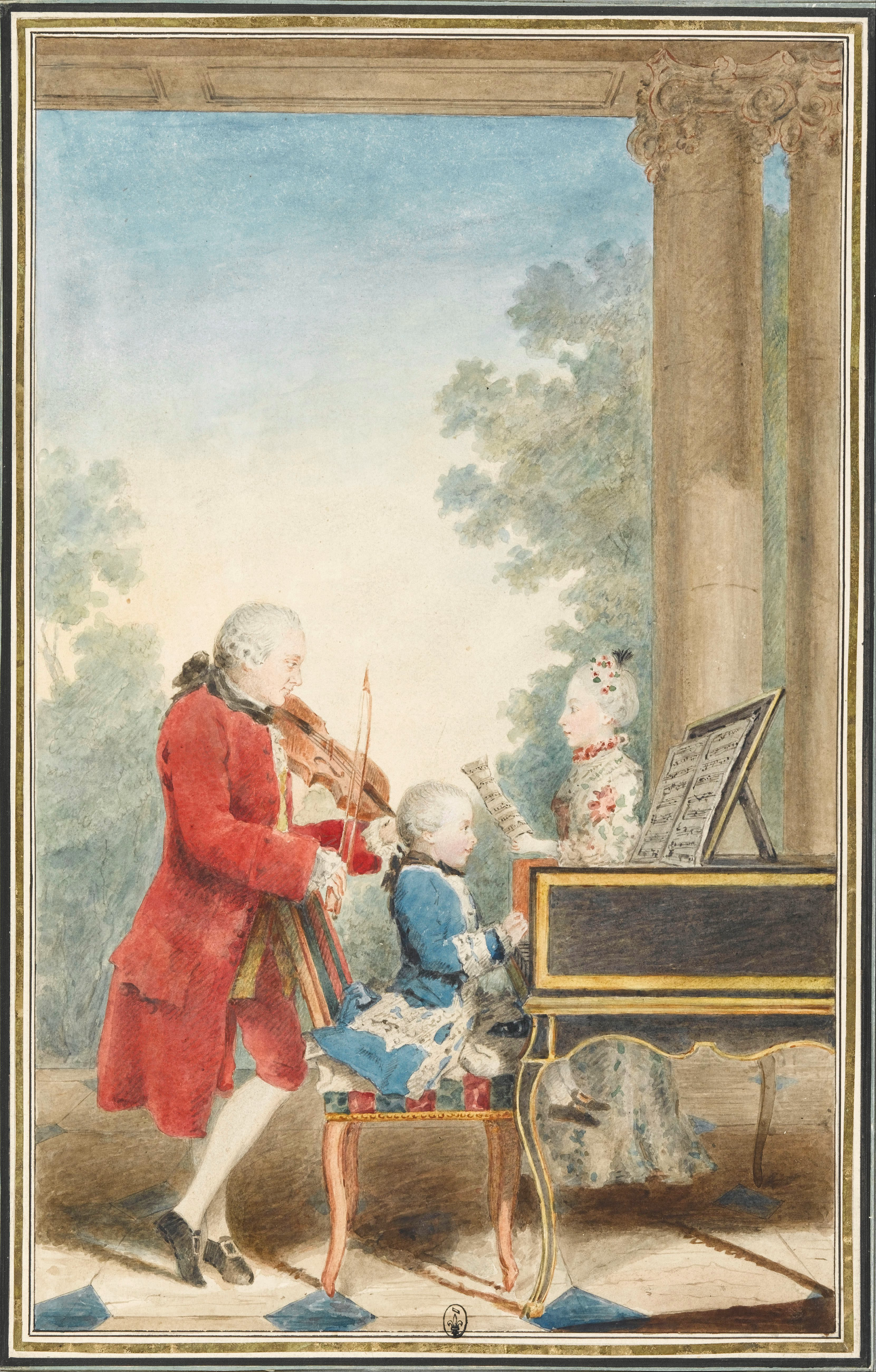
The Mozart family on tour: Leopold, Wolfgang, and Nannerl. Watercolor by Carmontelle, ca. 1763

Leopold Mozart decided to take his two child prodigies, the seven-year-old boy, Wolfgang (born 27 January 1756), and the 12-year-old girl, Nannerl (Maria Anna, born 30 July 1751), on their "Grand Tour" in June 1763. (Note: The Mozarts' "Grand Tour" in Europe, lasted from 9 June 1763 to 30 November 1766. Mozart was aged 7½ to just short of 11. His sister Nannerl was 4½ years older than Wolfgang, and went from age 12 to past 15.) Mozart's first visit to Paris lasted from 18 November 1763 to 10 April 1764, when the family departed for London. All the many letters of recommendation carried by Leopold proved ineffectual, except the one to Melchior Grimm, which led to an effective connection. Grimm was a German who had moved to Paris at age 25 and was an advanced amateur of music and opera, which he covered as a Paris-based journalist for the aristocracy of Europe. He was persuaded "to take the German prodigies under his wing." Grimm published a highly supportive article on the Mozart children in his Correspondance littéraire of December 1763, to facilitate Leopold's entrée into Parisian high society and musical circles.

Louis Philippe II, Duke of Orléans, the son of Grimm's employer Louis Philippe I, helped the Mozarts perform in Versailles, where they stayed for two weeks over Christmas and New Year. Hermann Abert explains that "only when they had performed at Versailles were they admitted to, and admired by, aristocratic circles." Grimm recounted with pride the impressive improvisations produced by young Mozart in private and public concerts. Leopold had four of his sonatas for keyboard and violin engraved and dedicated to King Louis XV's daughter, Madame Victoire, and the Dauphine's lady-in-waiting, by "THEOPH:W:MOZART Compositeur, et Maitre de Musique, agé de 7 ans". In 1766, Carmontelle produced a group portrait of the family performing, engraved at Grimm's instigation. In 1777, Michel-Barthélémy Ollivier painted Wolfgang playing the pianoforte in the Prince of Conti's salon at the Temple, a painting now in the Louvre Museum.

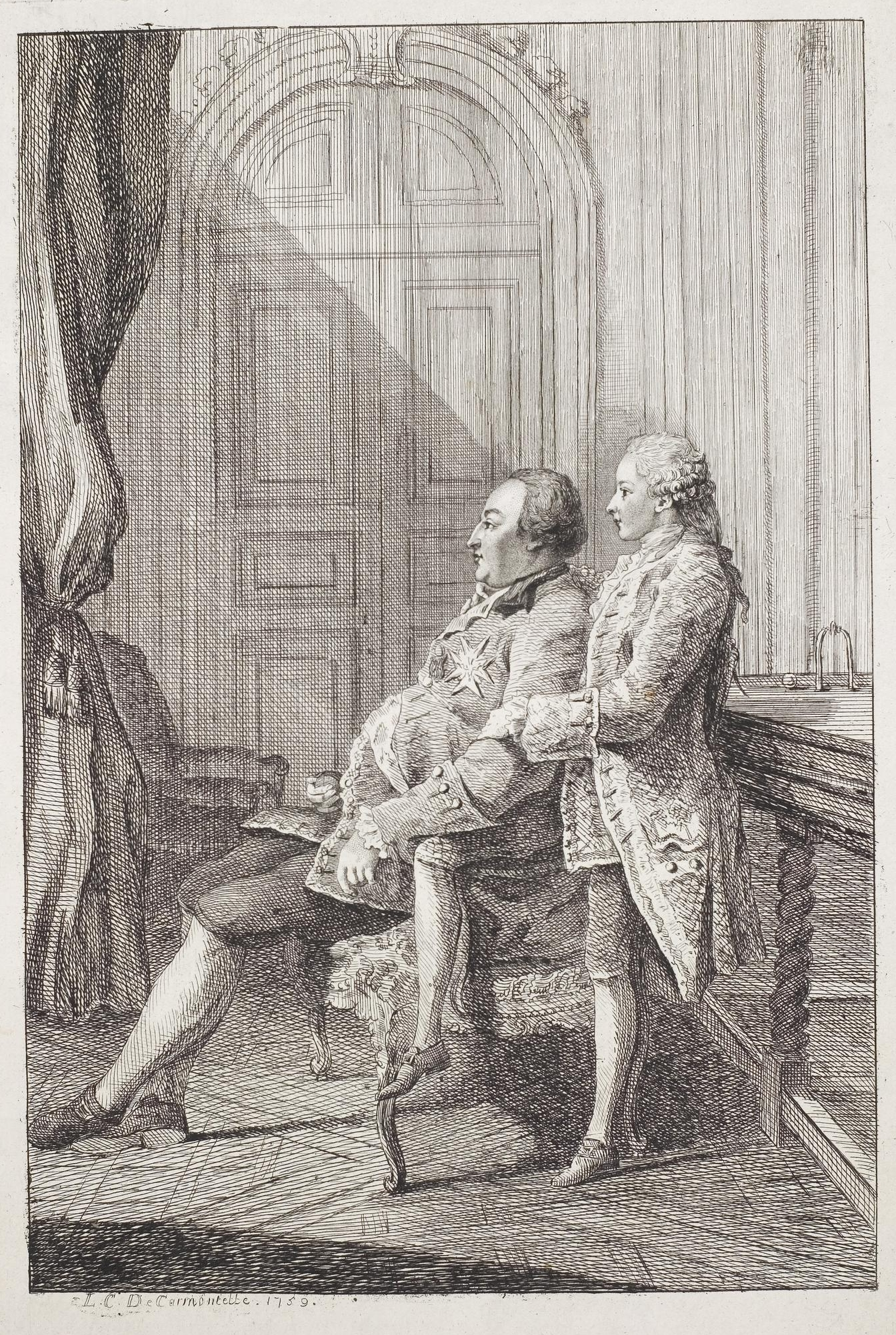
Grimm's employer Louis Philippe I, Duke of Orléans, a lover of theatre, with his son. Engraving by Carmontelle, 1759

After their long stay in London (15 months) and Holland (8 months), (Note: The Mozarts stayed in London for 15 months, their longest and most successful European visit, from 23 April 1764 to 24 July 1765. They went off to Holland for nearly 8 months, staying mostly at The Hague, from 11 September 1765 to the end of April 1766.) the Mozarts closed their "Grand Tour", which lasted three years and a half, by stopping over in Paris from 10 May to 9 July 1766, for Mozart's second visit to the French capital. Again, they were helped, guided, and mentored by Grimm. The children were by then 10 and 15 and had lost some of their public appeal as young prodigies on the now somewhat blasés Parisians. Grimm wrote a very flattering letter about the Mozart children dated 15 July 1766 in his Correspondance littéraire. Commenting on Mozart's remarkable progress in all areas of music-making, Grimm predicted the future operatic success of the young composer: "He has even written several Italian arias, and I have little doubt that before he has reached the age of twelve, he will already have had an opera performed at some Italian theatre." (Note: Mozart had written his first two arias, Va dal furor portata K. 21 in London, and Conservati fedele K. 23 in The Hague, and on his return to Salzburg, he was invited to write his first two operas, which were produced in the Salzburg Residenz of the Archbishop of Salzburg in 1767: Die Schuldigkeit des ersten Gebots on a German libretto, and Apollo et Hyacinthus, in Latin. Only his third opera, La finta semplice, K. 51 (46a), was on an Italian libretto, written in Vienna in 1768 for the Viennese opera house, but it was not produced there and was only performed in Salzburg in 1769.)

However, Abert warns that the reason why Grimm's Journal "nonetheless needs to be treated with caution is due to the personality of its principal contributor, for Grimm was not sufficiently well trained as a musician to do justice to the art that he was describing, nor was he the man to let slip the opportunity for a flash of wit or eloquent turn of phrase, even if it meant violating the truth in the process." Grimm's second prediction at the end of the same letter didn't turn out as prescient as the first one: "If these children live, they will not remain at Salzburg. Before long monarchs will vie for their possession." In fact, Mozart was unable to obtain employment as an opera composer from a European court and remained a free-lance opera writer all his life.

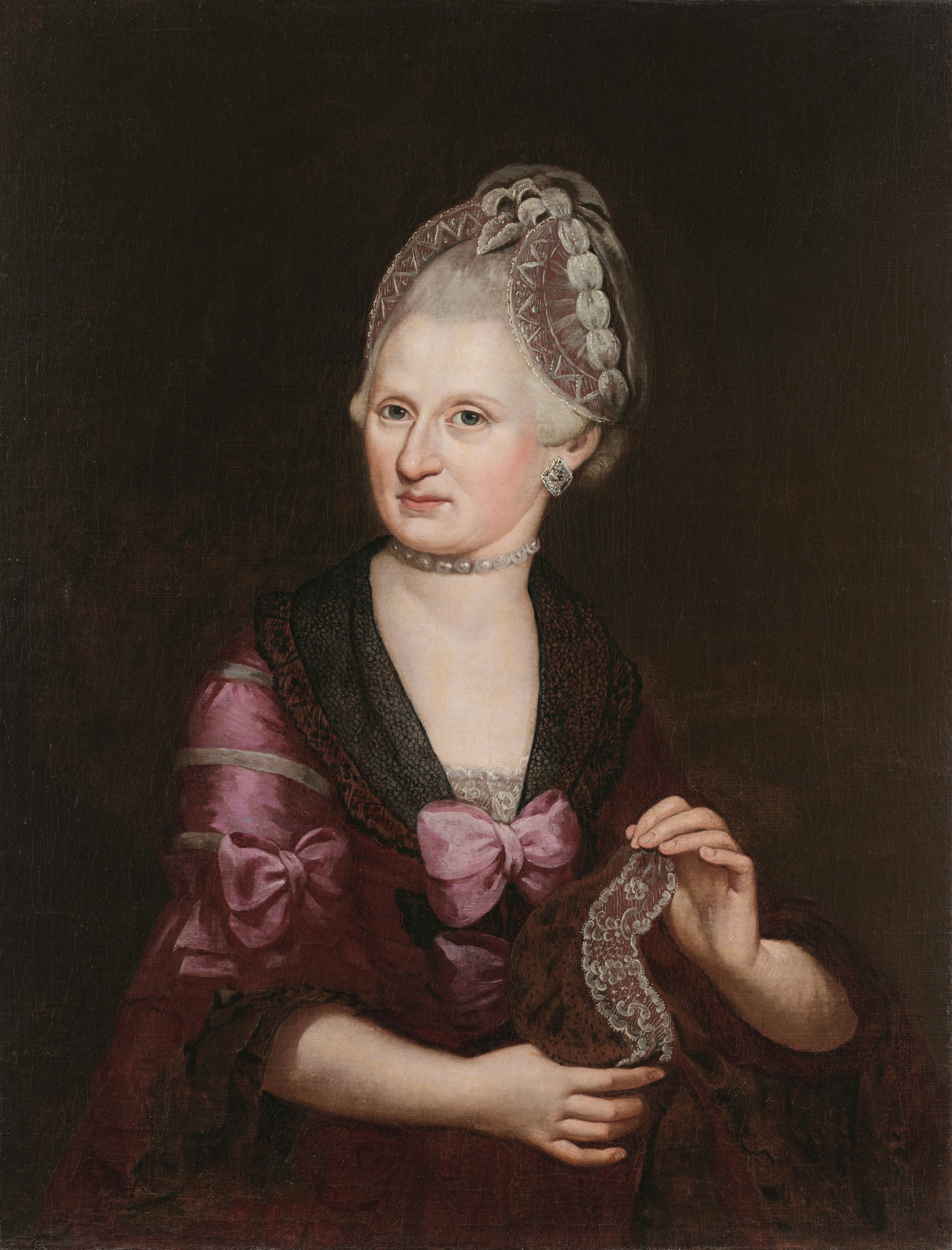
Anna Maria Pertl Mozart, wife of Leopold

Leopold sent Mozart, then aged 22, to Paris for his third and last visit, from 23 March to 26 September 1778. But this time Mozart went only with his mother, Anna Maria Mozart, while Leopold remained in Salzburg, in order to save his employment. Grimm helped, guided, and advised Mozart and his mother again, acting as a proud manager. But Mozart mostly encountered a series of disappointments, while tragedy struck when Anna Maria fell ill with typhoid fever and died on 3 July 1778. After the death of his mother, Mozart moved in with Grimm who was living with Mme d'Épinay, at 5, rue de la Chaussée-d'Antin. For the first time in his life, Mozart was on his own. Mozart stayed more than two months in pretty little room for invalids with a very agreeable prospect, which belonged to Louise d'Épinay; he sometimes dined with them but most of the time he was out.

Grimm, a man with strong opinions, nicknamed "Tyran le Blanc", and Mozart did not get along very well. Mozart found himself disappointed in Paris. The city was "indescribably dirty"; Grimm complained he was "not running around enough" to get pupils, as he found that calling on his introductions was tiring, too expensive, and unproductive: "People pay their respects, and that's it. They arrange for me to come on such and such a day; I then play for them, and they say Oh, c'est un prodige, c'est inconcevable, c'est étonnant. And, with that, adieu." He never got paid for his Concerto for flute and harp in C, K. 299, written for the Duke of Guinness and his daughter, nor for his ballet Les petits riens K. 299b.

Mozart was recruited by the director of the "Concert Spirituel", Joseph Legros, to write some choruses, K. 297a, which were played without giving credit to Mozart. Then Mozart wrote a Sinfonia concertante in E flat major K. 297b, for a group of four wind players from Mannheim, which he sold to Legros without keeping a copy. Legros never had it copied for performance, and the work became considered "lost". (Note: There is great controversy whether this work, 297b for flute, oboe, horn and bassoon, is the same as KAnh. C14.01, another sinfonia concertante in E-flat major for clarinet, oboe, horn and bassoon, which is "Mozart-sounding", but of contested authenticity. Abert 2007, p. 504, n. 56.) Mozart at last enjoyed one great success at the Concert Spirituel as a composer with his Symphony No. 31 in D, K. 297 (Paris Symphony), performed on 18 June 1778 "to unanimous acclaim". Mozart kept finding Paris "totally at odds" with his "genius, inclinations, knowledge, and sympathies". He kept expressing his deep dislike of the French, their character, their rudeness, their being "frightfully arrogant", and he was "appalled by their general immorality". Like Jean-Jacques Rousseau, Mozart found the French language inherently unmusical and "so damned impossible where music is concerned", ironizing that "the devil himself must have invented the language of these people". He felt that French music was worthless: "They understand nothing about music", echoing what Leopold had declared during their first visit to Paris: "The whole of French music is not worth a sou". He judged their singers inept. "I'm surrounded by nothing but beasts and animals. But how can it be otherwise, for they're just the same in all their actions, emotions, and passions."

Suspicious by nature, Mozart ended up distrusting Grimm, while "Grimm himself was bound to find Mozart increasingly baffling as a person — with his curious mixture of self-confidence and dreaminess". Mozart found himself obliged to borrow "as much as fifteen louis d'or" from Grimm. Voltaire's death on 30 May 1778 made clear "the full extent of the yawning void between them". Grimm warned Leopold that the need for continual and intense networking in Paris was too demanding for Wolfgang, "for it is a very tiring thing to run to the four corners of Paris and exhaust oneself in explanations. And then this profession will not please him, because it will keep him from writing, which is what he likes above all things." Their dealings "ended on a note of the deepest disharmony." Leopold agreed that Mozart should leave Paris: "You don't like Paris, and on the whole I don't blame you ... My next letter will tell you that you are to leave Paris." Grimm organized for Mozart's trip to Strasbourg, promising a diligence to cover the trip in five days, but forced Mozart to travel by stagecoach, a journey that took twelve days. Mozart "himself left the city on 26 September, as ill-tempered and disgruntled as when he had arrived there." Mozart broke the journey in Nancy on 3 October, finally arriving in Strasbourg on 14 October 1778.

In the course of his three visits, Mozart spent a total of 13 months in Paris, all of them under the guidance and assistance of Grimm.

=== Catherine II of Russia ===
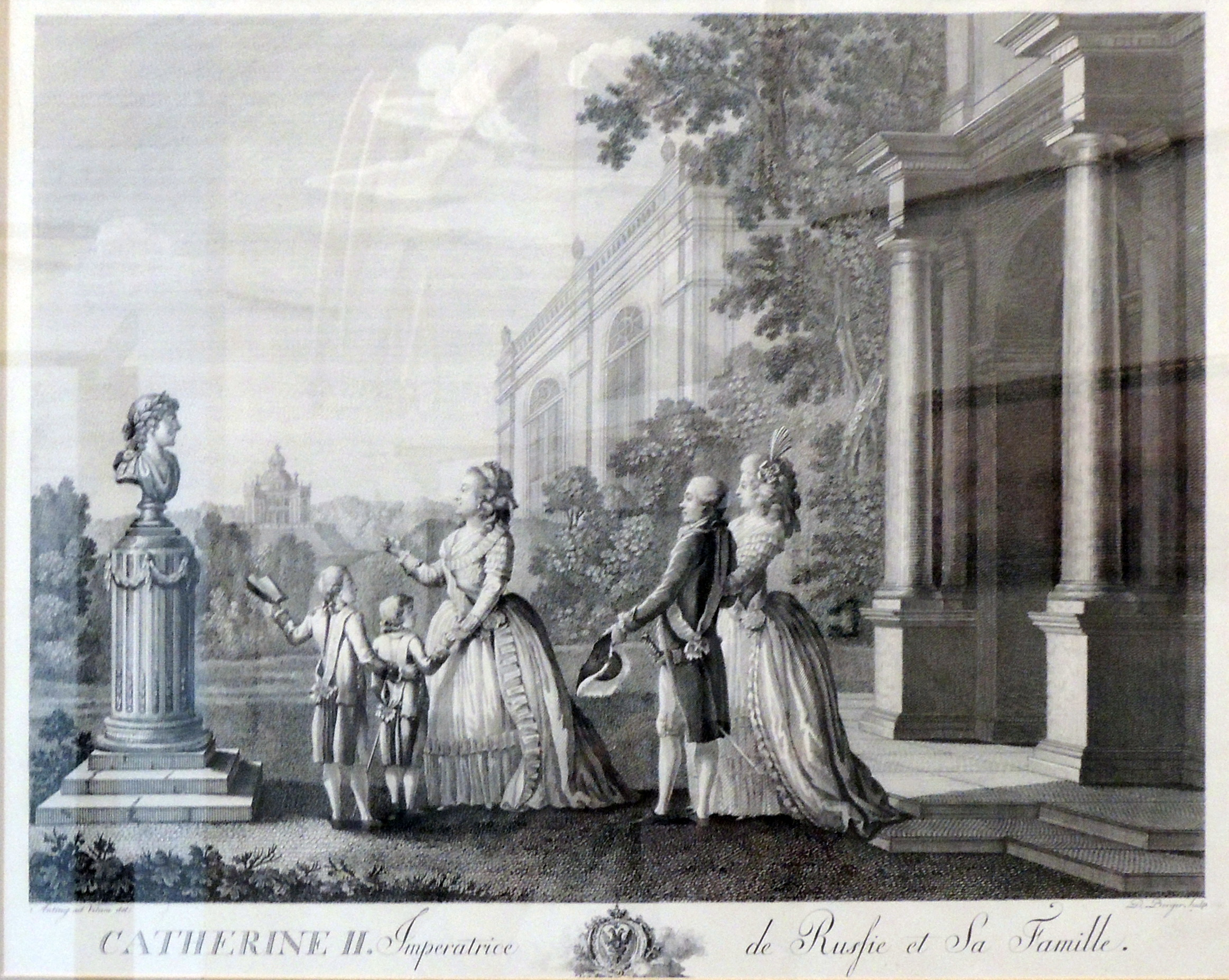
Catherine II with her family (1791)

Grimm's introduction to Catherine II of Russia took place at Saint Petersburg in 1773, when he was in the suite of Wilhelmina of Hesse-Darmstadt on the occasion of her marriage to the Tsarevitch Paul. (Note: He was made a baron of the Holy Roman Empire in 1772, paid by Princess Caroline Louise of Hesse-Darmstadt.) A few weeks later Diderot arrived. On 1 November they both became members of the Russian Academy of Sciences. Because of his atheism, Diderot had little success in the imperial capital, and when he criticized Catharine's style of governing, Grimm moved away from him. According to Jonathan Israel, Grimm was a representative of the Enlightened Absolutism. Grimm introduced Ferdinando Galiani and Cesare Beccaria, and promoted Jean Huber and Johann Friedrich Reiffenstein in the Russian Empire. He became minister of Saxe-Gotha at the French court in 1776. In 1777, he again visited Saint Petersburg, where he remained for nearly a year.

Grimm loved to play chess and cards with the empress. According to Simon Dixon, he influenced Catherine with his ideas on Rousseau. He acted as Paris agent for the empress in the purchase of works of art, and executed many confidential commissions for her. With his help, the libraries of Diderot (in 1766) and Voltaire (in 1778) were bought and sent to the Russian capital. In 1779, he introduced Giacomo Quarenghi as an architect and Clodion as a sculptor, when Étienne Maurice Falconet came back to Paris. In 1787, Catherine asked Grimm to burn her letters to him, "or else put them in safekeeping, so that no one can unearth them for a century."

=== Chevalier de Saint-Georges ===
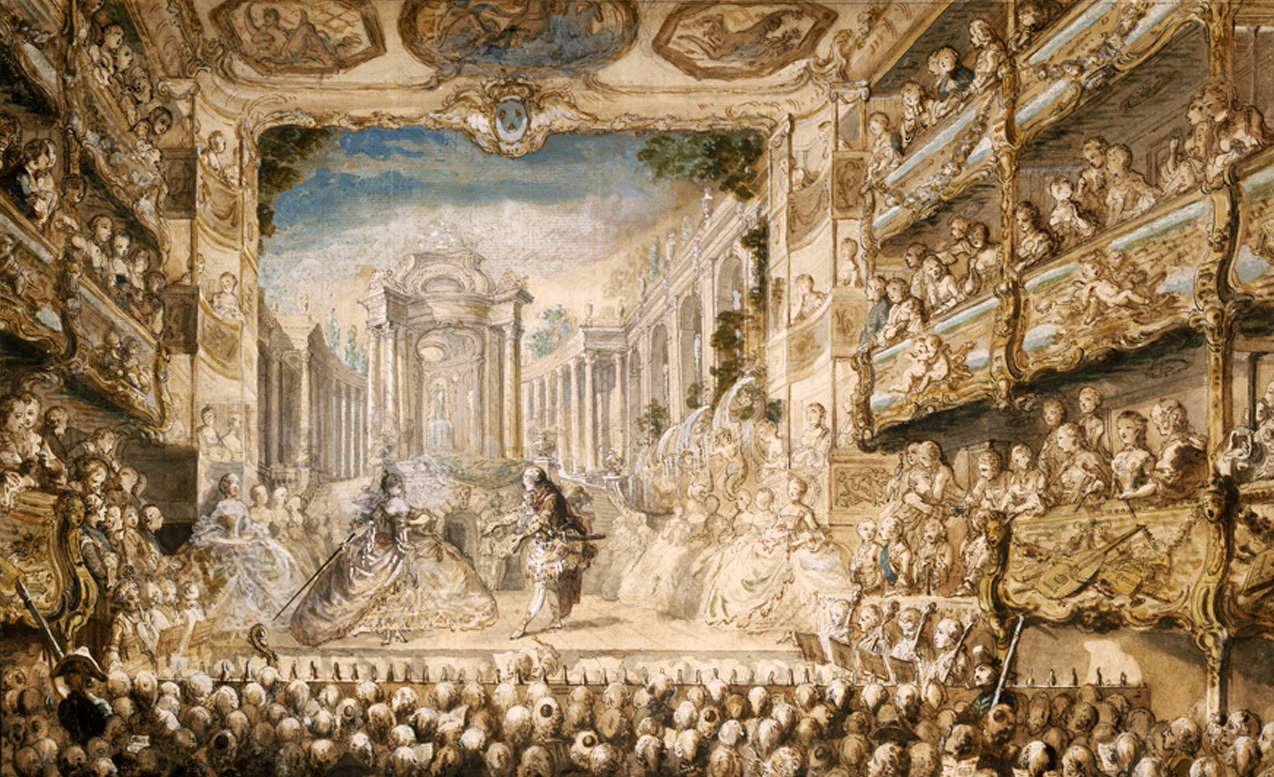
Lully's Armide as performed at the first Salle du Palais-Royal in the revival of 1761

Like Christoph Willibald Gluck and Ranieri de' Calzabigi, Grimm was occupied with operatic reform. Grimm loved theatre, criticized the Comédie-Française and praised the private theatre of Madame de Montesson, the wife of his employer.

In 1776, the Académie royale de musique (the Paris Opéra) was once again in dire straits. A "consortium of capitalists", to quote the critic Baron Grimm, proposed Chevalier de Saint-Georges as the next director of the opera. He helped Saint-Georges, living in the adjacent mansion with Madame de Montesson. Mozart spent over two months next to Saint-Georges. The two mansions had a communal garden, a chapel and a theater.

== Retirement ==
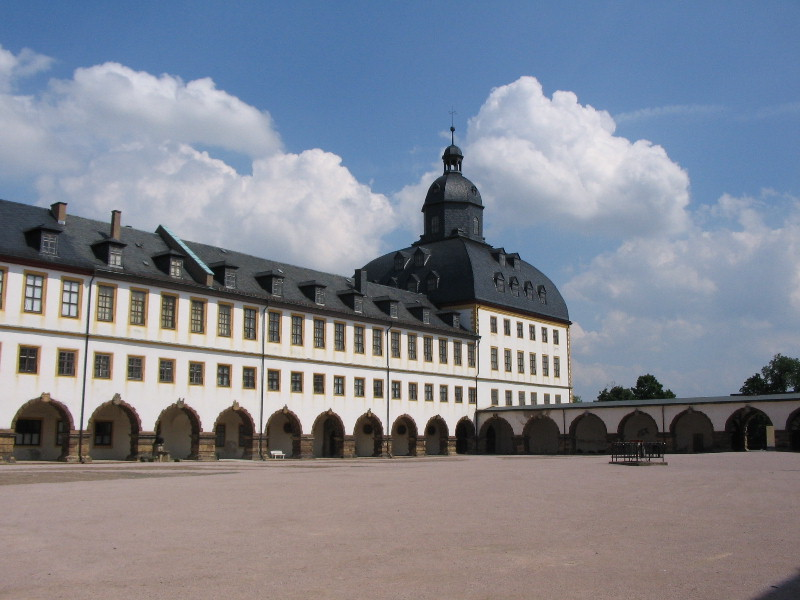
Friedenstein Castle

From Erinnerungen einer Urgrossmutter, it becomes clear that, in 1792, he left Rue du Mont-Blanc (in 1792, during the French Revolution, rue de la Chaussée d'Antin was renamed rue du Mont-Blanc, after the department of that name. It regained its original name in 1815), and settled in Gotha, living in the ducal palace Friedenstein Palace. His poverty was relieved by Empress Catherine, who shortly before her death appointed him minister of Russia at Hamburg. Although not very thrilled, he travelled with Émilie de Belsunce, Mme d'Épinay's granddaughter, later Comtesse de Bueil. When he suddenly became blind on 17 January 1797, he gave up his new post. (Grimm had problems with his eyesight since 1762.) He and the young Émilie stayed a few weeks in Altona. They travelled to Braunschweig, where they stayed from the summer of 1797 until June 1800, and where Émilie was tutored by Willem Bilderdijk. Grimm was then invited again by Ernest II, Duke of Saxe-Gotha-Altenburg.

He died in Gotha, aged 83, on 19 December 1807.

The main-belt asteroid 6912 Grimm was named after him.

== Works ==
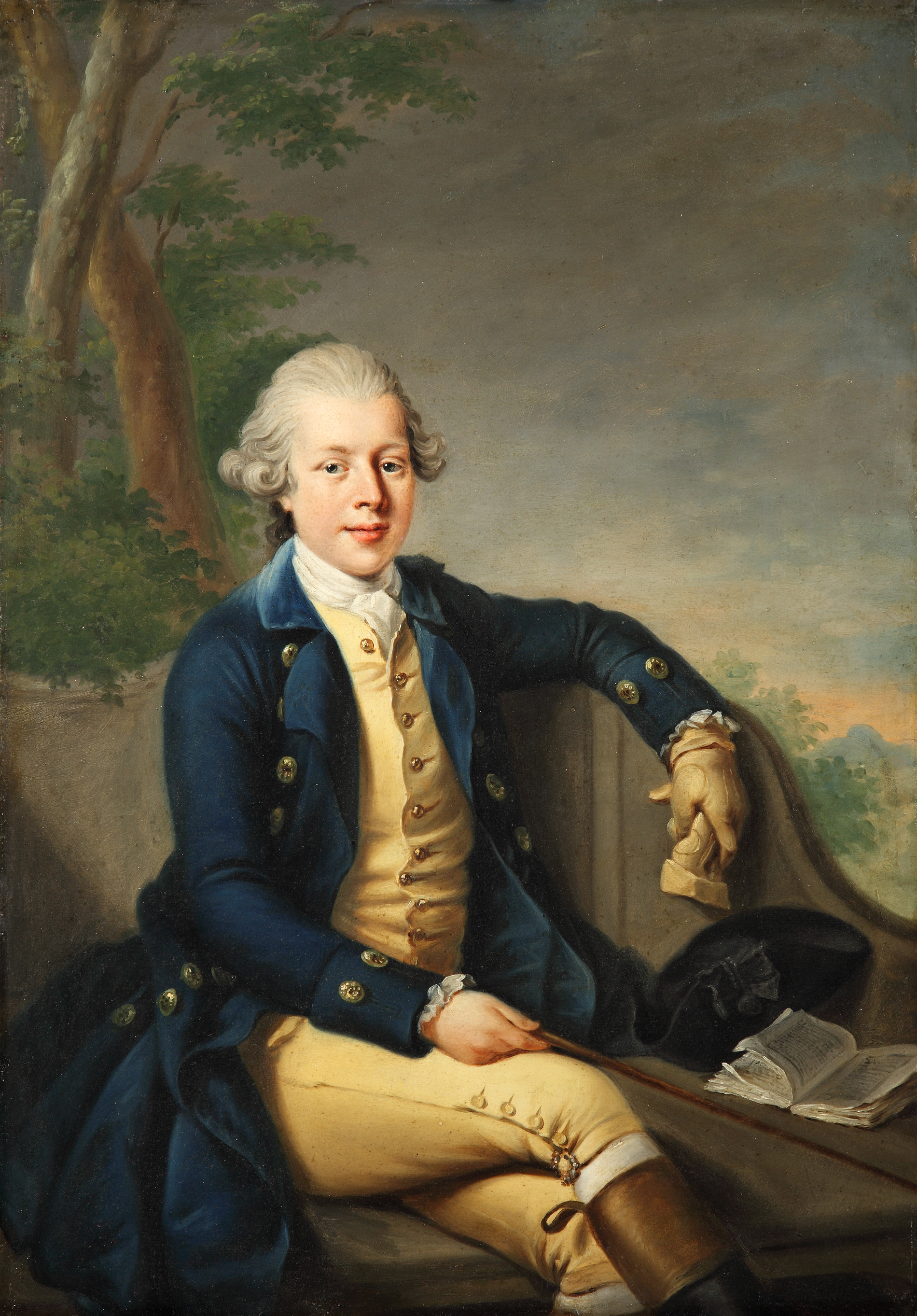
Ernest II of Saxe-Gotha

Grimm's Correspondance littéraire, philosophique et critique ..., depuis 1753 jusqu'en 1769, was edited, with many excisions, by Jean-Baptiste-Antoine Suard and published at Paris in 1812, in 6 vols. 8vo; deuxième partie, de 1771 a 1782, in 1812 in 5 vols. 8vo; and troisième partie, pendant une partie des années 1775 et 1776, et pendant les années 1782 a 1790 inclusivement, in 1813 in 5 vols. 8vo. A supplementary volume appeared in 1814; the whole correspondence was collected and published by Jules-Antoine Taschereau, with the assistance of A. Chaudé, in a Nouvelle Édition, revue et mise dans un meilleur ordre, avec des notes et des éclaircissements, et oil se trouvent rétablies pour la première fois les phrases supprimées par la censure impériale (Paris, 1829, 15 vols. 8vo); and the Correspondance inédite, et recueil de lettres, poésies, morceaux, et fragments retranchés par la censure impériale en 1812 et 1813 was published in 1829. The standard edition was that of Maurice Tourneux (16 vols., 1877–1882). It is now being replaced by the new edition published by Ulla Kölving at the Centre international d'étude du XVIIIe siècle, Ferney-Voltaire.

Grimm's Mémoire Historique sur l'origine et les suites de mon attachement pour l'impératrice Catherine II jusqu'au décès de sa majesté impériale, and Catherine's correspondence with Grimm (1774–1796) were published by Yakov Grot in 1880, in the collection of the Russian Imperial Historical Society. She treats him very familiarly and calls him Heraclite, Georges Dandin, etc. At the time of the Revolution, she begged him to destroy her letters, but he refused, and after his death, they were returned to Saint Petersburg. Grimm's side of the correspondence, however, is only partially preserved. He signs himself "Pleureur". Some of Grimm's letters, besides the official correspondence, are included in the edition of Tourneux; others are contained in the Erinnerungen einer Urgrossmutter of Katharina von Bechtolsheim, edited (Berlin, 1902) by Count C. Oberndorff.

== Notes ==
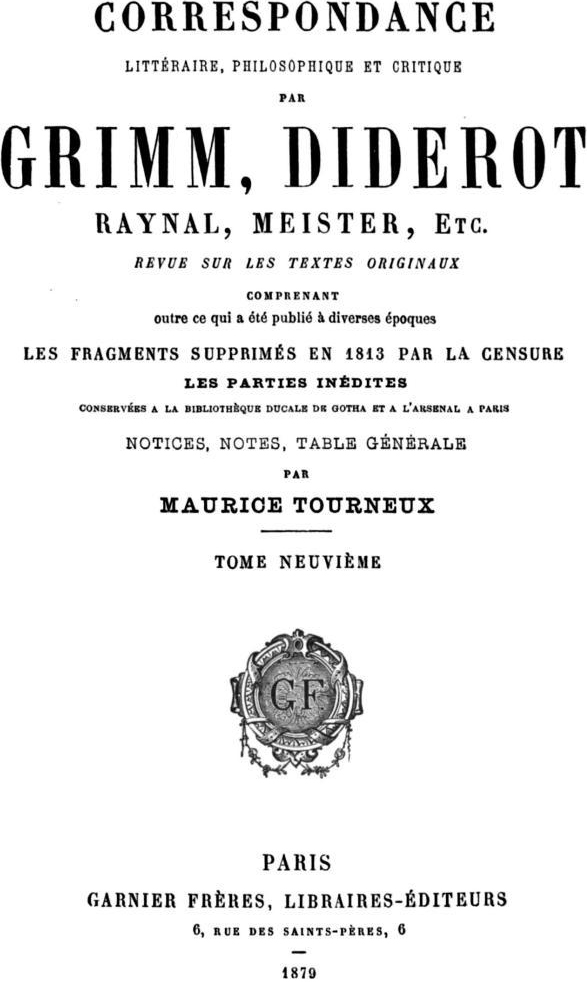
Front page of a reprint published in 1879 of the Correspondance littéraire
