= Age of Enlightenment =

European cultural movement

- 1687–1789
Scientific Revolution	Romanticism; First Industrial Revolution
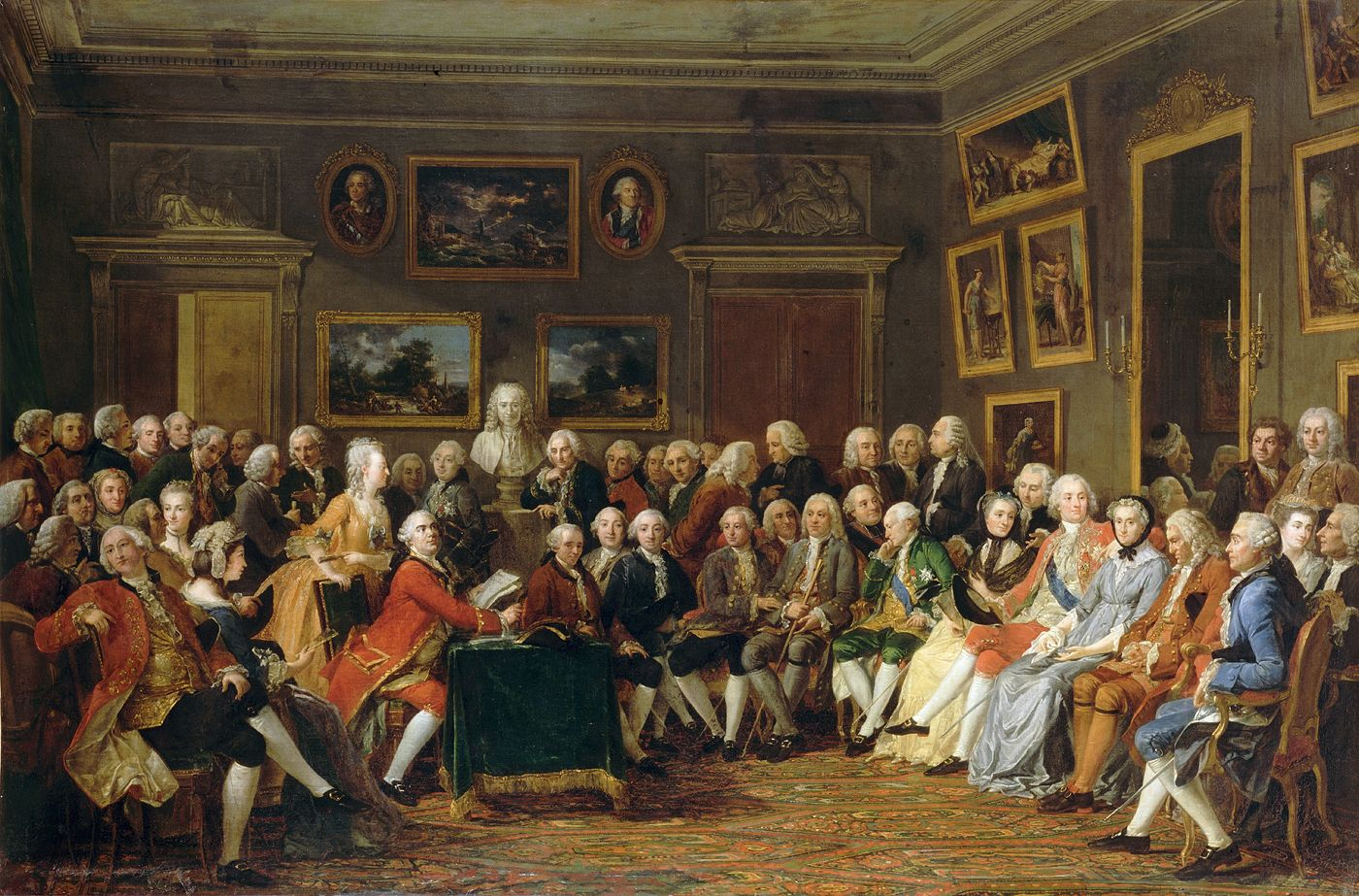
- In the Salon of Madame Geoffrin in 1755. Reading of Voltaire's tragedy, The Orphan of China, in the salon of Marie Thérèse Rodet Geoffrin, by Anicet Charles Gabriel Lemonnier, c. 1812 (Note: Back row, left to right: Jean-Baptiste-Louis Gresset, Pierre de Marivaux, Jean-François Marmontel, Joseph-Marie Vien, Antoine Léonard Thomas, Charles Marie de La Condamine, Guillaume Thomas François Raynal, Jean-Jacques Rousseau, Jean-Philippe Rameau, La Clairon, Charles-Jean-François Hénault, Étienne François, duc de Choiseul, a bust of Voltaire, Charles-Augustin de Ferriol d'Argental, Jean François de Saint-Lambert, Edmé Bouchardon, Jacques-Germain Soufflot, Jean-Baptiste Bourguignon d'Anville, Anne Claude de Caylus, Fortunato Felice, François Quesnay, Denis Diderot, Anne-Robert-Jacques Turgot, Baron de Laune, Chrétien Guillaume de Lamoignon de Malesherbes, Armand de Vignerot du Plessis, Pierre Louis Maupertuis, Jean-Jacques Dortous de Mairan, Henri François d'Aguesseau, Alexis Clairaut. Front row, right to left: Montesquieu, Sophie d'Houdetot, Claude Joseph Vernet, Bernard Le Bouyer de Fontenelle, Marie-Thérèse Rodet Geoffrin, Louis François, Prince of Conti, Marie Louise Nicole Élisabeth de La Rochefoucauld, Duchesse d'Anville, Philippe Jules François Mancini, François-Joachim de Pierre de Bernis, Claude Prosper Jolyot de Crébillon, Alexis Piron, Charles Pinot Duclos, Claude-Adrien Helvétius, Charles-André van Loo, Jean le Rond d'Alembert, Lekain at the desk reading aloud, Jeanne Julie Éléonore de Lespinasse, Anne-Marie du Boccage, René Antoine Ferchault de Réaumur, Françoise de Graffigny, Étienne Bonnot de Condillac, Bernard de Jussieu, Louis-Jean-Marie Daubenton, Georges-Louis Leclerc, Comte de Buffon.)
- Location: Early modern Europe
- Monarchs: Louis XIV; Louis XV; Louis XVI; Charles III; Frederick the Great; Catherine the Great; Joseph II; George III; Stanislaus II
- Leaders: Jean-Jacques Rousseau; Voltaire; Immanuel Kant; Johann Wolfgang von Goethe; David Hume; Adam Smith; Denis Diderot; Benjamin Franklin; Roger Williams
- Key events: American Revolution (1765–1783); French Revolution (1789–1799)

The Age of Enlightenment, also known as the Age of Reason or simply the Enlightenment, (Note: Also called the European Enlightenment, the Euro-American Enlightenment, or the Western Enlightenment. In other European languages: Dutch: de Verlichting; French: les Lumières, lit. 'the Lights' (i.e. "the lights of reason"); German: die Aufklärung; Italian: l'Illuminismo; Polish: Oświecenie; Portuguese: o Iluminismo; Russian: Просвещение; Spanish: la Ilustración; Swedish: Upplysningen) was a period of intellectual and cultural flourishing in Europe and Western civilization, emerging in the late 17th century in Western and Central Europe. It reached its peak in the 18th century as its ideas spread more widely across Europe and into the European colonies in the Americas and Oceania. Characterized by an emphasis on reason, empirical evidence, and the scientific method, the Enlightenment promoted ideals of individual liberty, religious tolerance, progress, and natural rights. Its thinkers advocated for constitutional government, the separation of church and state, and the application of rational principles to social and political reform.

The Enlightenment emerged from and built upon the Scientific Revolution of the 16th and 17th centuries, which had established new methods of empirical inquiry through the work of figures such as Galileo Galilei, Johannes Kepler, Francis Bacon, Pierre Gassendi, Christiaan Huygens, and Isaac Newton. Philosophical foundations were laid by thinkers including René Descartes, Thomas Hobbes, Baruch Spinoza, and John Locke, whose ideas about reason, natural rights, and empirical knowledge became central to Enlightenment thought. The dating of the period of the beginning of the Enlightenment can be attributed to the publication of Descartes' Discourse on the Method in 1637, with his method of systematically disbelieving everything unless there was a well-founded reason for accepting it, and featuring his dictum, Cogito, ergo sum ('I think, therefore I am'). Others cite the publication of Newton's Principia Mathematica (1687) as the culmination of the Scientific Revolution and the beginning of the Enlightenment. European historians traditionally dated its beginning with the death of Louis XIV of France in 1715 and its end with the outbreak of the French Revolution in 1789. Many historians now date the end of the Enlightenment as the start of the 19th century, with the latest proposed year being the death of Immanuel Kant in 1804.

The movement was characterized by the widespread circulation of ideas through new institutions: scientific academies, literary salons, coffeehouses, Masonic lodges, and an expanding print culture of books, journals, and pamphlets. The ideas of the Enlightenment undermined the authority of the monarchy and religious officials and paved the way for the political revolutions of the 18th and 19th centuries. A variety of 19th-century movements, including liberalism, socialism, and neoclassicism, trace their intellectual heritage to the Enlightenment. The Enlightenment was marked by an increasing awareness of the relationship between the mind and the everyday media of the world, and by an emphasis on the scientific method and reductionism, along with increased questioning of religious dogma—an attitude captured by Kant's essay Answering the Question: What Is Enlightenment?, where the phrase sapere aude ('dare to know') can be found.

The central doctrines of the Enlightenment were individual liberty, representative government, the rule of law, and religious freedom, in contrast to an absolute monarchy or single party state and the religious persecution of faiths other than those formally established and often controlled outright by the state. By contrast, other intellectual currents included arguments in favour of anti-Christianity, Deism and Atheism, accompanied by demands for secular states, bans on religious education, suppression of monasteries, the suppression of the Jesuits, and the expulsion of religious orders. The Enlightenment also faced contemporary criticism, later termed the "Counter-Enlightenment" by Sir Isaiah Berlin, which defended traditional religious and political authorities against rationalist critique.

== Influential intellectuals ==
The Enlightenment was preceded by and closely associated with the Scientific Revolution. Earlier philosophers whose work influenced the Enlightenment included Francis Bacon, Pierre Gassendi, René Descartes, Thomas Hobbes, Baruch Spinoza, John Locke, Pierre Bayle, and Gottfried Wilhelm Leibniz. Some of the figures of the Enlightenment included Cesare Beccaria, George Berkeley, Denis Diderot, Émilie Du Châtelet, David Hume, Immanuel Kant, Lord Monboddo, Montesquieu, Jean-Jacques Rousseau, Adam Smith, Roger Williams, Hugo Grotius, and Voltaire.

One of the most influential Enlightenment publications was the Encyclopédie (Encyclopedia). Published between 1751 and 1772 in 35 volumes, it was compiled by Diderot, Jean le Rond d'Alembert, and a team of 150 others. The Encyclopédie helped spread the ideas of the Enlightenment across Europe and beyond.

Other publications of the Enlightenment included Locke's A Letter Concerning Toleration (1689) and Two Treatises of Government (1689); Berkeley's A Treatise Concerning the Principles of Human Knowledge (1710), Voltaire's Letters on the English (1733) and Philosophical Dictionary (1764); Du Châtelet's Foundations of Physics (1740); Hume's A Treatise of Human Nature (1740); Montesquieu's The Spirit of the Laws (1748); Rousseau's Discourse on Inequality (1754) and The Social Contract (1762); Cesare Beccaria's On Crimes and Punishments (1764); Adam Smith's The Theory of Moral Sentiments (1759) and The Wealth of Nations (1776), Kant's Critique of Pure Reason (1781), and at the close of the age, the pioneering proto-feminist text, Wollstoncraft's A Vindication Of The Rights Of Woman (1792).

== Topics ==
=== Philosophy ===
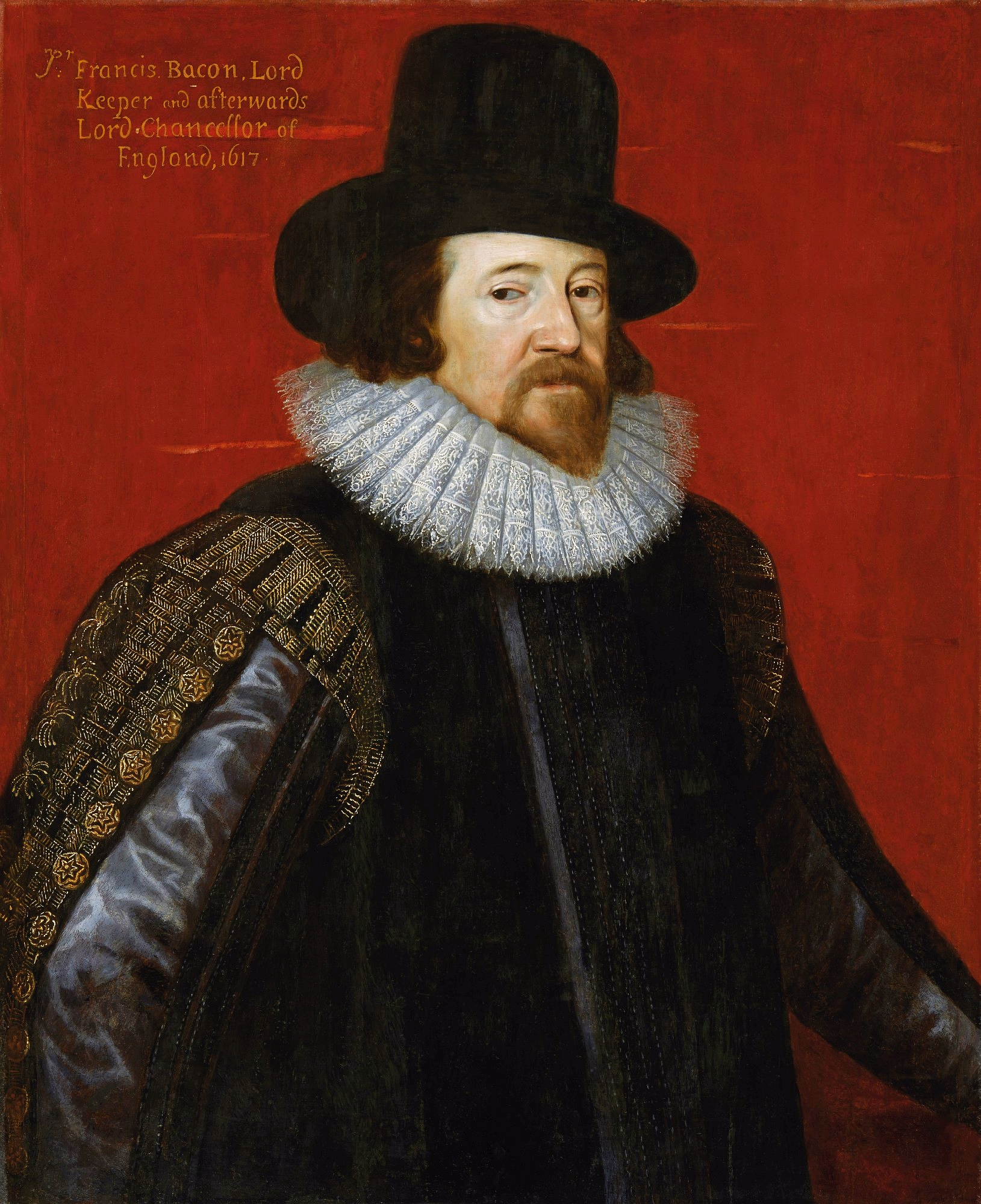
English philosopher Francis Bacon's work is considered foundational to the Enlightenment

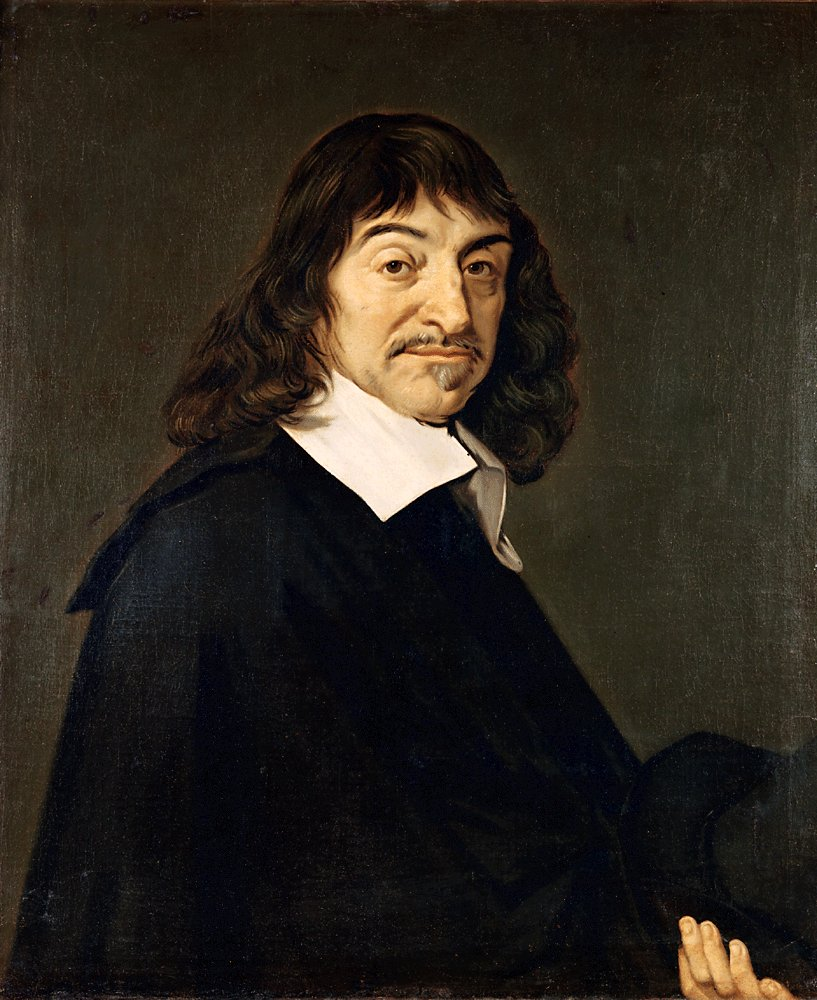
René Descartes, widely considered a seminal figure in the emergence of modern philosophy and science

Bacon's empiricism and Descartes' rationalist philosophy laid the foundation for enlightenment thinking. Descartes' attempt to construct the sciences on a secure metaphysical foundation was not as successful as his method of doubt applied to philosophy, which led to a dualistic doctrine of mind and matter. His skepticism was refined by Locke's Essay Concerning Human Understanding (1690) and Hume's writings in the 1740s. Descartes' dualism was challenged by Spinoza's uncompromising assertion of the unity of matter in his Tractatus (1670) and Ethics (1677).

According to Jonathan Israel, these laid down two distinct lines of Enlightenment thought: first, the moderate variety, following Descartes, Locke, and Christian Wolff, which sought accommodation between reform and the traditional systems of power and faith, and, second, the Radical Enlightenment, inspired by the philosophy of Spinoza, advocating democracy, individual liberty, freedom of expression, and eradication of religious authority. The moderate variety tended to be deistic whereas the radical tendency separated the basis of morality entirely from theology. Both lines of thought were eventually opposed by a conservative Counter-Enlightenment which sought a return to faith.

In the mid-18th century, Paris became the center of philosophic and scientific activity challenging traditional doctrines and dogmas. After the Edict of Fontainebleau in 1685, the relationship between church and the absolutist government was very strong. The early enlightenment emerged in protest to these circumstances, gaining ground under the support of Madame de Pompadour, the mistress of Louis XV. Called the Siècle des Lumières, the philosophical movement of the Enlightenment had already started by the early 18th century, when Pierre Bayle launched the popular and scholarly Enlightenment critique of religion. As a skeptic Bayle only partially accepted the philosophy and principles of rationality. He did draw a strict boundary between morality and religion. The rigor of his Dictionnaire Historique et Critique influenced many of the Enlightenment Encyclopédistes. By the mid-18th century the French Enlightenment had found a focus in the project of the Encyclopédie. The philosophical movement was led by Voltaire and Rousseau, who argued for a society based upon reason rather than faith and Catholic doctrine, for a new civil order based on natural law, and for science based on experiments and observation. The political philosopher Montesquieu introduced the idea of a separation of powers in a government, a concept which was enthusiastically adopted by the authors of the United States Constitution. While the philosophes of the French Enlightenment were not revolutionaries and many were members of the nobility, their ideas played an important part in undermining the legitimacy of the Old Regime and shaping the French Revolution.

Francis Hutcheson, a moral philosopher and founding figure of the Scottish Enlightenment, described the utilitarian and consequentialist principle that virtue is that which provides, in his words, "the greatest happiness for the greatest numbers." Much of what is incorporated in the scientific method (the nature of knowledge, evidence, experience, and causation) and some modern attitudes towards the relationship between science and religion were developed by Hutcheson's protégés in Edinburgh: David Hume and Adam Smith. Hume became a major figure in the skeptical philosophical and empiricist traditions of philosophy.

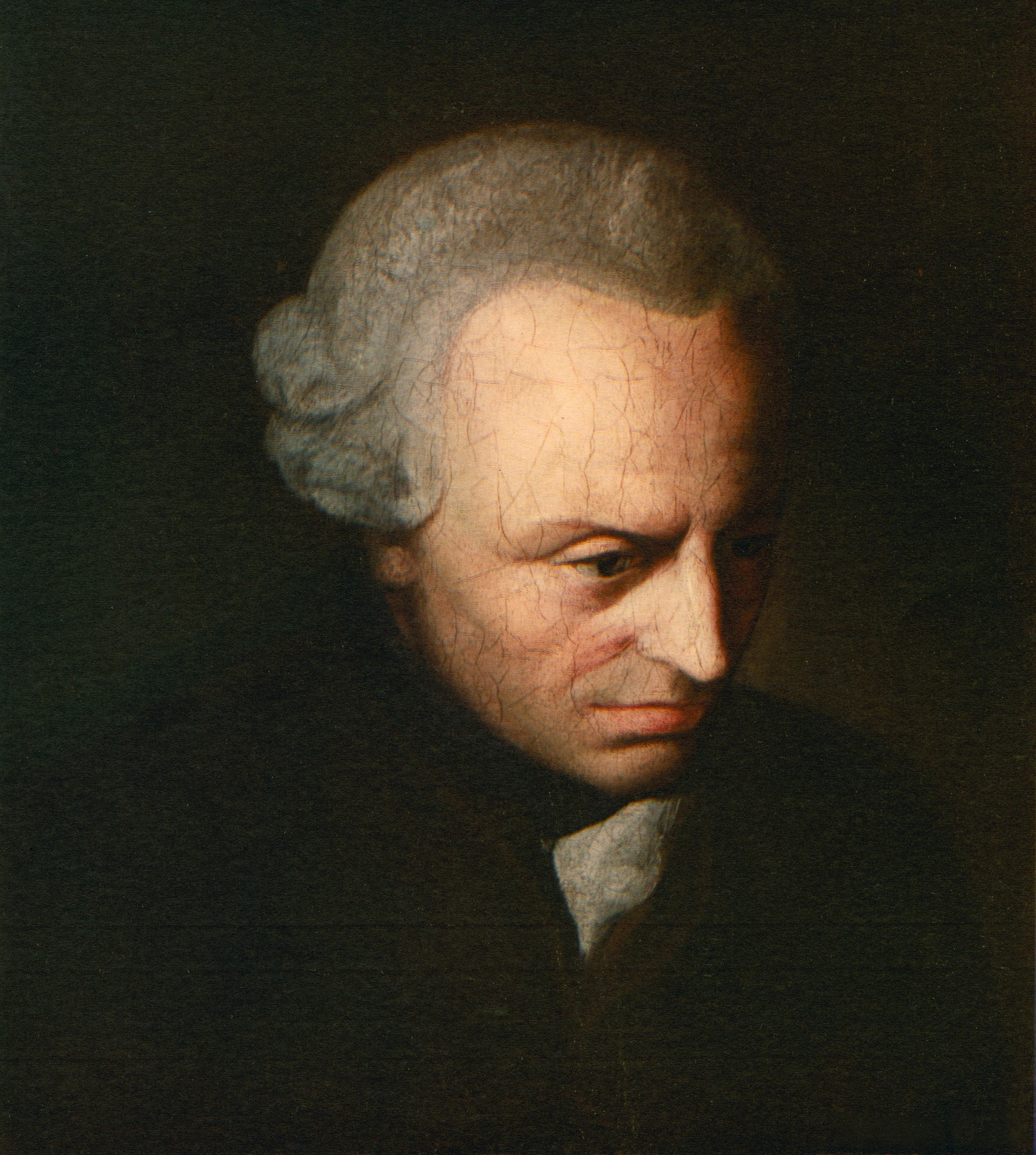
German philosopher Immanuel Kant, one of the most influential figures of Enlightenment and modern philosophy

Kant tried to reconcile rationalism and religious belief, individual freedom and political authority, as well as map out a view of the public sphere through private and public reason. Kant's work continued to influence German intellectual life and European philosophy more broadly well into the 20th century.

Mary Wollstonecraft was one of England's earliest feminist philosophers. She argued for a society based on reason and that women as well as men should be treated as rational beings. She is best known for her 1792 work, A Vindication of the Rights of Woman.

=== Science ===
Science played an important role in Enlightenment discourse and thought. Many Enlightenment writers and thinkers had backgrounds in the sciences and associated scientific advancement with the overthrow of religion and traditional authority in favour of the development of free speech and thought. There were immediate practical results. The experiments of Antoine Lavoisier were used to create the first modern chemical plants in Paris, and the experiments of the Montgolfier brothers enabled them to launch the first manned flight in a hot air balloon in 1783.

Broadly speaking, Enlightenment science greatly valued empiricism and rational thought and was embedded with the Enlightenment ideal of advancement and progress. The study of science, under the heading of natural philosophy, was divided into physics and a conglomerate grouping of chemistry and natural history, which included anatomy, biology, geology, mineralogy, and zoology. As with most Enlightenment views, the benefits of science were not seen universally: Rousseau criticized the sciences for distancing man from nature and not operating to make people happier.

Science during the Enlightenment was dominated by scientific societies and academies, which had largely replaced universities as centres of scientific research and development. Societies and academies were also the backbone of the maturation of the scientific profession. Scientific academies and societies grew out of the Scientific Revolution as the creators of scientific knowledge, in contrast to the scholasticism of the university. Some societies created or retained links to universities, but contemporary sources distinguished universities from scientific societies by claiming that the university's utility was in the transmission of knowledge while societies functioned to create knowledge. As the role of universities in institutionalized science began to diminish, learned societies became the cornerstone of organized science. Official scientific societies were chartered by the state to provide technical expertise.

Most societies were granted permission to oversee their own publications, control the election of new members and the administration of the society. In the 18th century, a very large number of official academies and societies were founded in Europe; by 1789 there were over 70 official scientific societies. In reference to this growth, Bernard de Fontenelle coined the term "the Age of Academies" to describe the 18th century.

Another important development was the popularization of science among an increasingly literate population. Philosophes introduced the public to many scientific theories, most notably through the Encyclopédie and the popularization of Newtonianism by Voltaire and Émilie du Châtelet. Some historians have marked the 18th century as a drab period in the history of science. The century saw significant advancements in the practice of medicine, mathematics, and physics; the development of biological taxonomy; a new understanding of magnetism and electricity; and the maturation of chemistry as a discipline, which established the foundations of modern chemistry.

The influence of science began appearing more commonly in poetry and literature. While some societies were established with ties to universities or maintained existing ones contemporary sources often distinguished between the two, asserting that universities primarily served to transmit knowledge, whereas scientific societies were oriented toward the creation of new knowledge. James Thomson penned his "A Poem to the Memory of Sir Isaac Newton," which mourned the loss of Newton and praised his science and legacy.

=== Sociology, economics, and law ===
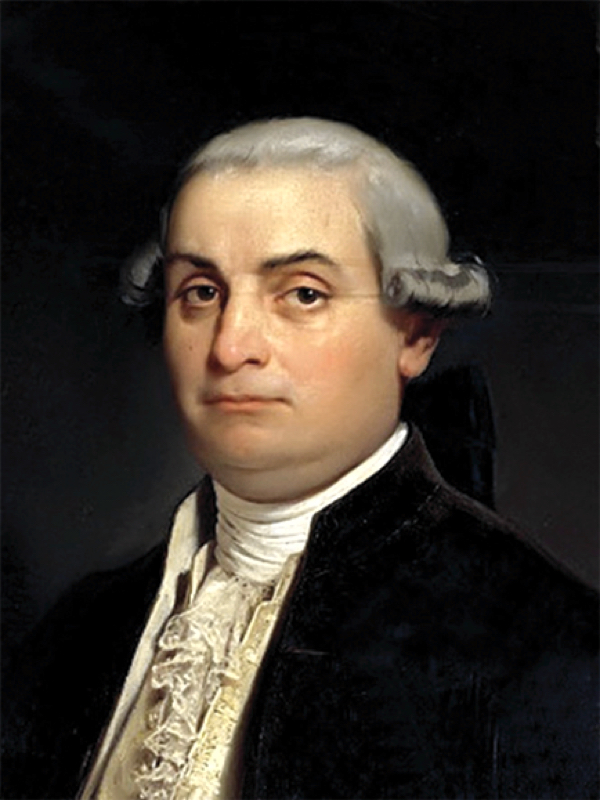
Cesare Beccaria, father of classical criminal theory

Hume and other Scottish Enlightenment thinkers developed a "science of man," which was expressed historically in works by authors including James Burnett, Adam Ferguson, John Millar, and William Robertson, all of whom merged a scientific study of how humans behaved in ancient and primitive cultures with a strong awareness of the determining forces of modernity. Modern sociology largely originated from this movement, and Hume's philosophical concepts that directly influenced James Madison (and thus the U.S. Constitution), and as popularised by Dugald Stewart was the basis of classical liberalism.

In 1776, Adam Smith published The Wealth of Nations, often considered the first work on modern economics as it had an immediate impact on British economic policy that continues into the 21st century. It was immediately preceded and influenced by Anne Robert Jacques Turgot's drafts of Reflections on the Formation and Distribution of Wealth (1766). Smith acknowledged indebtedness and possibly was the original English translator.

Beccaria, a jurist, criminologist, philosopher, and politician and one of the great Enlightenment writers, became famous for his masterpiece Dei delitti e delle pene (Of Crimes and Punishments, 1764). His treatise, translated into 22 languages, condemned torture and the death penalty and was a founding work in the field of penology and the classical school of criminology by promoting criminal justice. Francesco Mario Pagano wrote studies such as Saggi politici (Political Essays, 1783); and Considerazioni sul processo criminale (Considerations on the Criminal Trial, 1787), which established him as an international authority on criminal law.

=== Politics ===
The Enlightenment has long been seen as the foundation of modern Western political and intellectual culture. The Enlightenment brought political modernization to the West, in terms of introducing democratic values and institutions and the creation of modern, liberal democracies. Scholars have widely accepted this thesis and has been reinforced by the large-scale studies by Robert Darnton, Roy Porter, and, most recently, by Jonathan Israel. Enlightenment thought was deeply influential in the political realm. European rulers such as Catherine II of Russia, Joseph II of Austria, and Frederick II of Prussia tried to apply Enlightenment thought on religious and political tolerance, which became known as enlightened absolutism. Many of the major political and intellectual figures behind the American Revolution associated themselves closely with the Enlightenment: Benjamin Franklin visited Europe repeatedly and contributed actively to the scientific and political debates there and brought the newest ideas back to Philadelphia; Thomas Jefferson closely followed European ideas and later incorporated some of the ideals of the Enlightenment into the Declaration of Independence; and Madison incorporated these ideals into the U.S. Constitution during its framing in 1787.

==== Theories of government ====
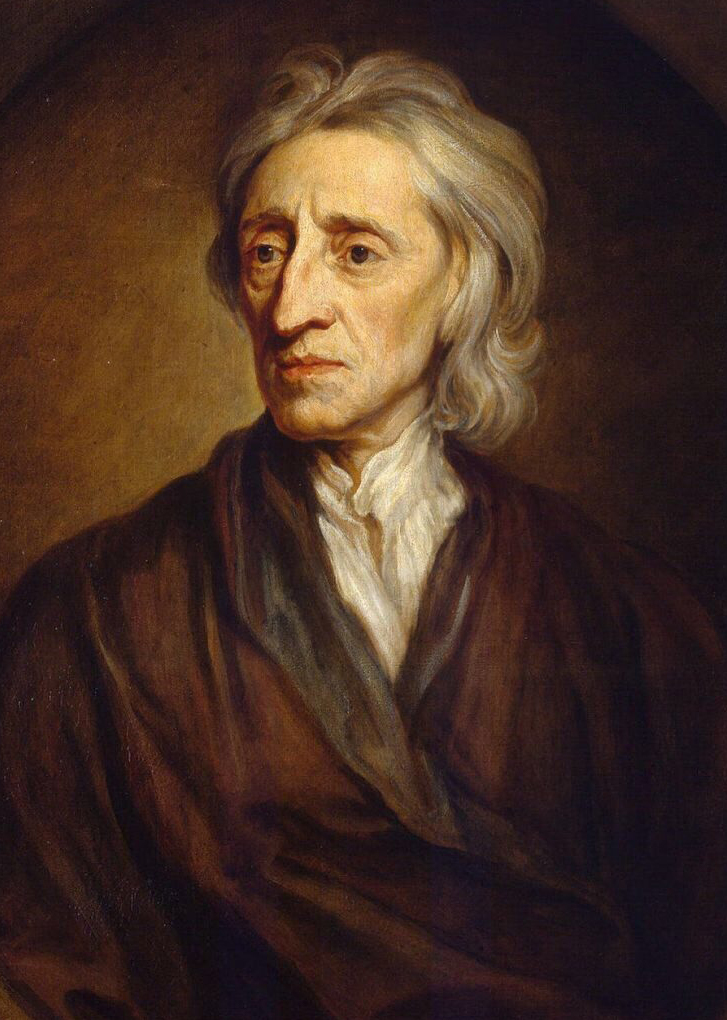
Philosopher John Locke argued that the authority of government stems from a social contract based on natural rights. According to Locke, the authority of government was limited and required the consent of the governed.

Locke, one of the most influential Enlightenment thinkers, based his governance philosophy on social contract theory, a subject that permeated Enlightenment political thought. English philosopher Thomas Hobbes ushered in this new debate with his work Leviathan in 1651. Hobbes also developed some of the fundamentals of European liberal thought: the right of the individual, the natural equality of all men, the artificial character of the political order (which led to the later distinction between civil society and the state), the view that all legitimate political power must be "representative" and based on the consent of the people, and a liberal interpretation of law which leaves people free to do whatever the law does not explicitly forbid.

Both Locke and Rousseau developed social contract theories in Two Treatises of Government and Discourse on Inequality, respectively. While quite different works, Locke, Hobbes, and Rousseau agreed that a social contract, in which the government's authority lies in the consent of the governed, is necessary for man to live in civil society. Locke defines the state of nature as a condition in which humans are rational and follow natural law, in which all men are born equal and with the right to life, liberty, and property. However, when one citizen breaks the law of nature both the transgressor and the victim enter into a state of war, from which it is virtually impossible to break free. Therefore, Locke said that individuals enter into civil society to protect their natural rights via an "unbiased judge" or common authority, such as courts. In contrast, Rousseau's conception relies on the supposition that "civil man" is corrupted, while "natural man" has no want he cannot fulfill himself. Natural man is only taken out of the state of nature when the inequality associated with private property is established. Rousseau said that people join into civil society via the social contract to achieve unity while preserving individual freedom. This is embodied in the sovereignty of the general will, the moral and collective legislative body constituted by citizens.

Locke is known for his statement that individuals have a right to "Life, Liberty, and Property," and his belief that the natural right to property is derived from labor. Tutored by Locke, Anthony Ashley-Cooper, 3rd Earl of Shaftesbury, wrote in 1706: "There is a mighty Light which spreads its self over the world especially in those two free Nations of England and Holland; on whom the Affairs of Europe now turn." Locke's theory of natural rights has influenced many political documents, including the U.S. Declaration of Independence and the French National Constituent Assembly's Declaration of the Rights of Man and of the Citizen.

Some philosophes argued that the establishment of a contractual basis of rights would lead to the market mechanism and capitalism, the scientific method, religious tolerance, and the organization of states into self-governing republics through democratic means. In this view, the tendency of the philosophes in particular to apply rationality to every problem is considered the essential change.

Although much of Enlightenment political thought was dominated by social contract theorists, Hume and Ferguson criticized this camp. Hume's essay Of the Original Contract argues that governments derived from consent are rarely seen and civil government is grounded in a ruler's habitual authority and force. It is precisely because of the ruler's authority over-and-against the subject that the subject tacitly consents, and Hume says that the subjects would "never imagine that their consent made him sovereign," rather the authority did so. Similarly, Ferguson did not believe citizens built the state, rather polities grew out of social development. In his 1767 An Essay on the History of Civil Society, Ferguson uses the four stages of progress, a theory that was popular in Scotland at the time, to explain how humans advance from a hunting and gathering society to a commercial and civil society without agreeing to a social contract.

Both Rousseau's and Locke's social contract theories rest on the presupposition of natural rights, which are not a result of law or custom but are things that all men have in pre-political societies and are therefore universal and inalienable. The most famous natural right formulation comes from Locke's Second Treatise, when he introduces the state of nature. For Locke, the law of nature is grounded on mutual security or the idea that one cannot infringe on another's natural rights, as every man is equal and has the same inalienable rights. These natural rights include perfect equality and freedom, as well as the right to preserve life and property.

Locke argues against indentured servitude on the basis that enslaving oneself goes against the law of nature because a person cannot surrender their own rights: freedom is absolute, and no one can take it away. Locke argues that one person cannot enslave another because it is morally reprehensible, although he introduces a caveat by saying that enslavement of a lawful captive in time of war would not go against one's natural rights.

==== Enlightened absolutism ====
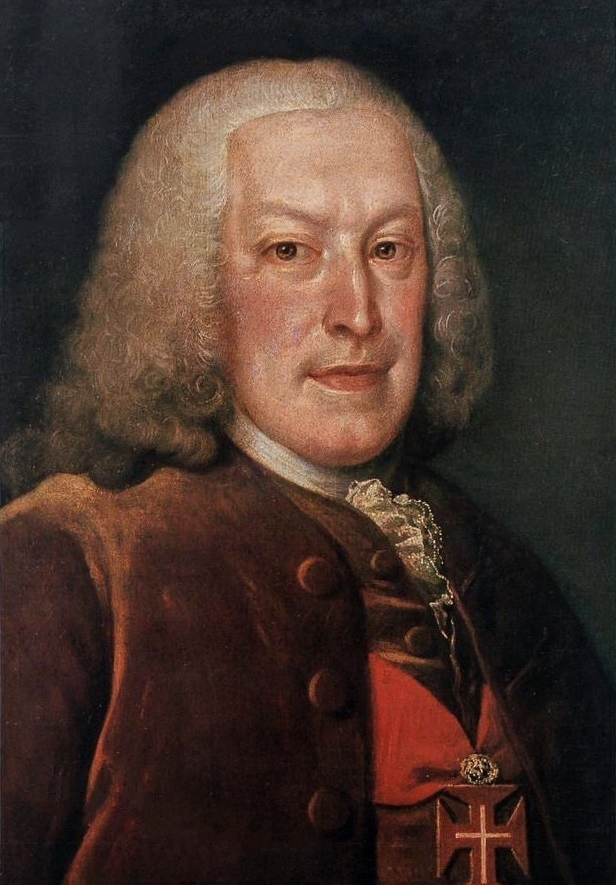
The Marquis of Pombal, as the head of the government of Portugal, implemented sweeping socio-economic reforms.

The leaders of the Enlightenment were not especially democratic, as they more often look to absolute monarchs as the key to imposing reforms designed by the intellectuals. Voltaire despised democracy and said the absolute monarch must be enlightened and must act as dictated by reason and justice—in other words, be a "philosopher-king."

In several nations, rulers welcomed leaders of the Enlightenment at court and asked them to help design laws and programs to reform the system, typically to build stronger states. These rulers are called "enlightened despots" by historians. They included Frederick the Great of Prussia, Catherine the Great of Russia, Leopold II of Tuscany and Joseph II of Austria. Joseph was over-enthusiastic, announcing many reforms that had little support so that revolts broke out and his regime became a comedy of errors, and nearly all his programs were reversed. Senior ministers Pombal in Portugal and Johann Friedrich Struensee in Denmark also governed according to Enlightenment ideals. In Poland, the model constitution of 1791 expressed Enlightenment ideals, but was in effect for only one year before the nation was partitioned among its neighbors. More enduring were the cultural achievements, which created a nationalist spirit in Poland.

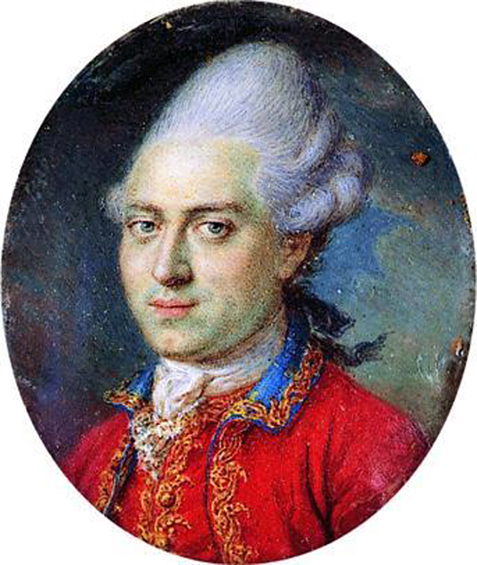
Denmark's minister Johann Struensee, a social reformer, was publicly executed in 1772 for usurping royal authority.

Frederick the Great, the king of Prussia from 1740 to 1786, saw himself as a leader of the Enlightenment and patronized philosophers and scientists at his court in Berlin. Voltaire, who had been imprisoned and maltreated by the French government, was eager to accept Frederick's invitation to live at his palace. Frederick explained: "My principal occupation is to combat ignorance and prejudice... to enlighten minds, cultivate morality, and to make people as happy as it suits human nature, and as the means at my disposal permit."

==== American Revolution and French Revolution ====
The Enlightenment has been frequently linked to the American Revolution of 1776 and the French Revolution of 1789—both had some intellectual influence from Thomas Jefferson. A key aspect of this era was a profound shift from the absolute monarchies of Europe, which asserted the "divine right" to rule. John Locke rejected this view in his writings on the Two Treatises of Government (1689). He asserted that citizens were seen to possess natural rights, including life, liberty, and property. Therefore governments exist to protect these rights through the "consent of the governed." The clash between these competing ethos often resulted in violent upheaval in differing ways. In France, Ancien régime, with its rigid social hierarchy and absolute monarchical power, was systematically dismantled during the French Revolution. While the American Revolution focused more on breaking free from a government - represented by King George III and Parliament - that colonists felt did not adequately represent their interests.

Alexis de Tocqueville proposed the French Revolution as the inevitable result of the radical opposition created in the 18th century between the monarchy and the men of letters of the Enlightenment. These men of letters constituted a sort of "substitute aristocracy that was both all-powerful and without real power." This illusory power came from the rise of "public opinion," born when absolutist centralization removed the nobility and the bourgeoisie from the political sphere. The "literary politics" that resulted promoted a discourse of equality and was hence in fundamental opposition to the monarchical regime. De Tocqueville "clearly designates... the cultural effects of transformation in the forms of the exercise of power."

=== Religion ===
It does not require great art or magnificently trained eloquence, to prove that Christians should tolerate each other. I, however, am going further: I say that we should regard all men as our brothers. What? The Turk my brother? The Chinaman my brother? The Jew? The Siam? Yes, without doubt; are we not all children of the same father and creatures of the same God?

— Voltaire (1763)

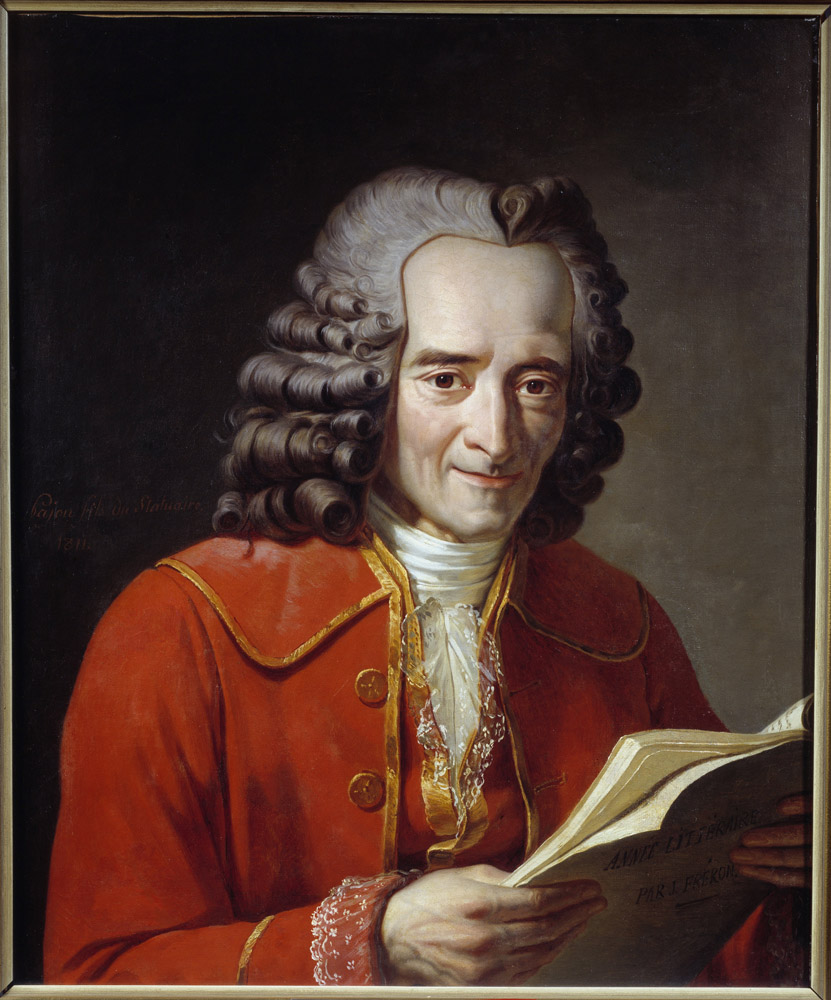
French philosopher Voltaire argued for religious tolerance.

Enlightenment era religious commentary was a response to the preceding century of religious conflict in Europe, especially the Thirty Years' War. Theologians of the Enlightenment wanted to reform their faith to its generally non-confrontational roots and to limit the capacity for religious controversy to spill over into politics and warfare while still maintaining a true faith in God. For moderate Christians, this meant a return to simple Scripture. Locke abandoned the corpus of theological commentary in favor of an "unprejudiced examination" of the Word of God alone. He determined the essence of Christianity to be a belief in Christ the redeemer and recommended avoiding more detailed debate. Anthony Collins, one of the English freethinkers, published his "Essay concerning the Use of Reason in Propositions the Evidence whereof depends on Human Testimony" (1707), in which he rejects the distinction between "above reason" and "contrary to reason," and demands that revelation should conform to man's natural ideas of God. In the Jefferson Bible, Thomas Jefferson went further and dropped any passages dealing with miracles, visitations of angels, and the resurrection of Jesus after his death, as he tried to extract the practical Christian moral code of the New Testament.

Enlightenment scholars sought to curtail the political power of organized religion and thereby prevent another age of intolerant religious war. Spinoza determined to remove politics from contemporary and historical theology (e.g., disregarding Judaic law). Moses Mendelssohn advised affording no political weight to any organized religion but instead recommended that each person follow what they found most convincing. They believed a good religion based in instinctive morals and a belief in God should not theoretically need force to maintain order in its believers, and both Mendelssohn and Spinoza judged religion on its moral fruits, not the logic of its theology.

Several novel ideas about religion developed with the Enlightenment, including deism and talk of atheism. According to Thomas Paine, deism is the simple belief in God the Creator with no reference to the Bible or any other miraculous source. Instead, the deist relies solely on personal reason to guide his creed, which was eminently agreeable to many thinkers of the time. Atheism was much discussed, but there were few proponents. Wilson and Reill note: "In fact, very few enlightened intellectuals, even when they were vocal critics of Christianity, were true atheists. Rather, they were critics of orthodox belief, wedded rather to skepticism, deism, vitalism, or perhaps pantheism." Some followed Pierre Bayle and argued that atheists could indeed be moral men. Many others like Voltaire held that without belief in a God who punishes evil, the moral order of society was undermined; that is, since atheists gave themselves to no supreme authority and no law and had no fear of eternal consequences, they were far more likely to disrupt society. Bayle observed that, in his day, "prudent persons will always maintain an appearance of [religion]," and he believed that even atheists could hold concepts of honor and go beyond their own self-interest to create and interact in society. Locke said that if there were no God and no divine law, the result would be moral anarchy: every individual "could have no law but his own will, no end but himself. He would be a god to himself, and the satisfaction of his own will the sole measure and end of all his actions."

==== Separation of church and state ====
The "Radical Enlightenment" promoted the concept of separating church and state, an idea that is often credited to Locke. According to his principle of the social contract, Locke said that the government lacked authority in the realm of individual conscience, as this was something rational people could not cede to the government for it or others to control. For Locke, this created a natural right in the liberty of conscience, which he said must therefore remain protected from any government authority.

These views on religious tolerance and the importance of individual conscience, along with the social contract, became particularly influential in the American colonies and the drafting of the United States Constitution. In a letter to the Danbury Baptist Association in Connecticut, Thomas Jefferson calls for a "wall of separation between church and state" at the federal level. He previously had supported successful efforts to disestablish the Church of England in Virginia and authored the Virginia Statute for Religious Freedom. Jefferson's political ideals were greatly influenced by the writings of Locke, Bacon, and Newton, whom he considered the three greatest men that ever lived.

== National variations ==
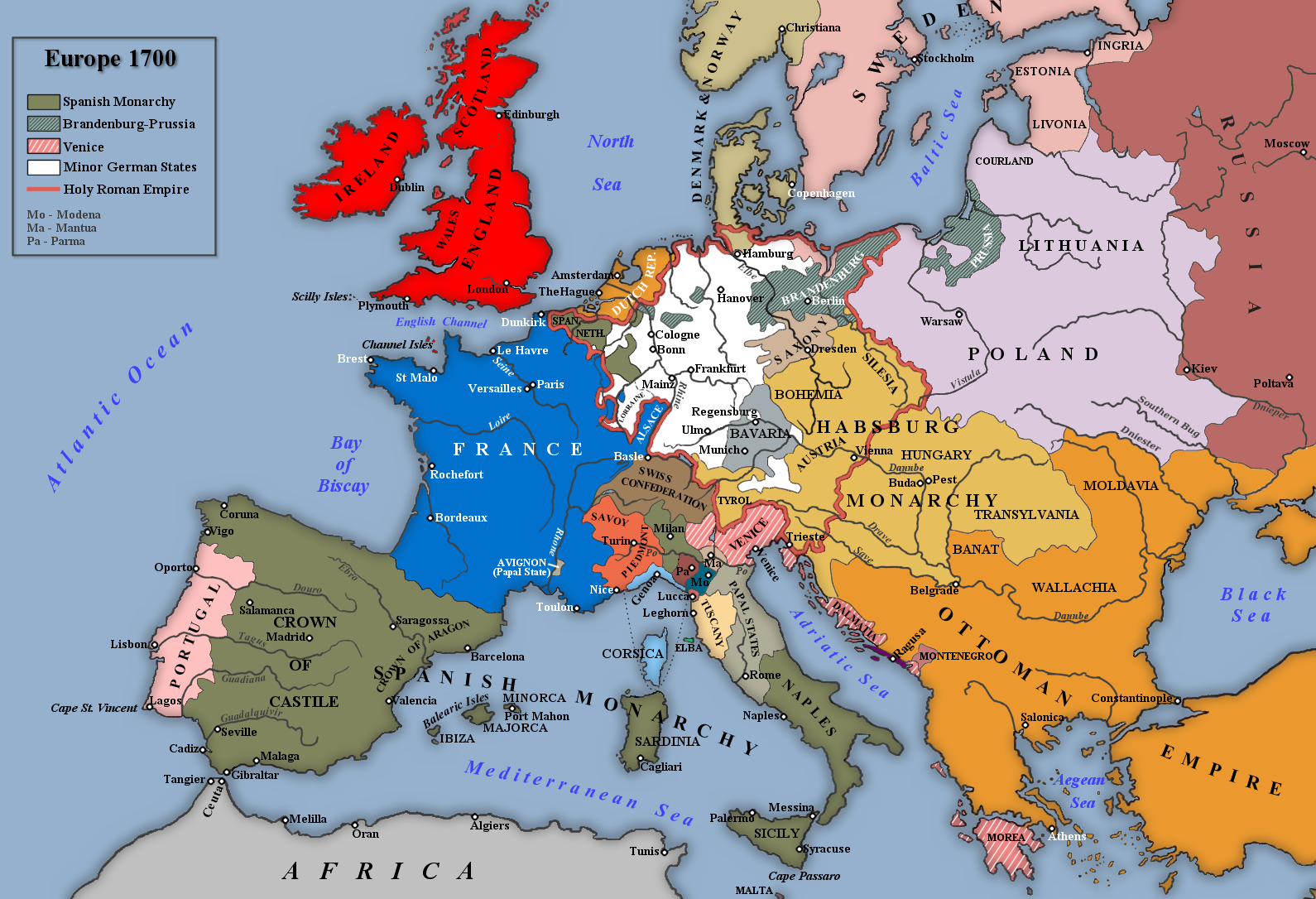
Europe at the beginning of the War of the Spanish Succession, 1700

The Enlightenment took hold in most European countries and influenced nations globally, often with a specific local emphasis. For example, in France it became associated with anti-government and anti-Church radicalism, while in Germany it reached deep into the middle classes, where it expressed a spiritualistic and nationalistic tone without threatening governments or established churches. Government responses varied widely. In France, the government was hostile, and the philosophes fought against its censorship, sometimes being imprisoned or hounded into exile. The British government, for the most part, ignored the Enlightenment's leaders in England and Scotland, although it did give Newton a knighthood and a very lucrative government office.

A common theme among most countries which derived Enlightenment ideas from Europe was the intentional non-inclusion of Enlightenment philosophies pertaining to slavery. Originally during the French Revolution, a revolution deeply inspired by Enlightenment philosophy, "France's revolutionary government had denounced slavery, but the property-holding 'revolutionaries' then remembered their bank accounts." Slavery frequently showed the limitations of the Enlightenment ideology as it pertained to European colonialism, since many colonies of Europe operated on a plantation economy fueled by slave labor. In 1791, the Haitian Revolution, a slave rebellion by emancipated slaves against French colonial rule in the colony of Saint-Domingue, broke out. European nations and the United States, despite the strong support for Enlightenment ideals, refused to "[give support] to Saint-Domingue's anti-colonial struggle."

=== Great Britain ===
==== England ====
The existence of an English Enlightenment can be typified by The Lunar Society of Birmingham which was a society of prominent figures in philosophy, engineering and other sciences, who met regularly between 1765 and 1813 at Soho House in Birmingham. Regular attendees included - Joseph Priestley, Matthew Boulton, James Watt, William Murdoch and John Wilkinson. The majority of textbooks on British history make little or no mention of an English Enlightenment. Some surveys of the entire Enlightenment include England and others ignore it, although they do include coverage of such major intellectuals as Joseph Addison, Edward Gibbon, John Locke, Isaac Newton, Alexander Pope, Joshua Reynolds, and Jonathan Swift. Freethinking, a term describing those who stood in opposition to the institution of the Church, and the literal belief in the Bible, can be said to have begun in England no later than 1713, when Anthony Collins wrote his "Discourse of Free-thinking," which gained substantial popularity. This essay attacked the clergy of all churches and was a plea for deism.

Roy Porter argues that the reasons for this neglect were the assumptions that the movement was primarily French-inspired, that it was largely a-religious or anti-clerical, and that it stood in outspoken defiance to the established order. Porter admits that after the 1720s England could claim thinkers to equal Diderot, Voltaire, or Rousseau. However, its leading intellectuals such as Gibbon, Edmund Burke and Samuel Johnson were all quite conservative and supportive of the standing order. Porter says the reason was that Enlightenment had come early to England and had succeeded such that the culture had accepted political liberalism, philosophical empiricism, and religious toleration, positions which intellectuals on the continent had to fight against powerful odds. Furthermore, England rejected the collectivism of the continent and emphasized the improvement of individuals as the main goal of enlightenment.

According to Derek Hirst, the 1640s and 1650s saw a revived economy characterised by growth in manufacturing, the elaboration of financial and credit instruments, and the commercialisation of communication. The gentry found time for leisure activities, such as horse racing and bowling. In the high culture important innovations included the development of a mass market for music, increased scientific research, and an expansion of publishing. All the trends were discussed in depth at the newly established coffee houses.

==== Scotland ====
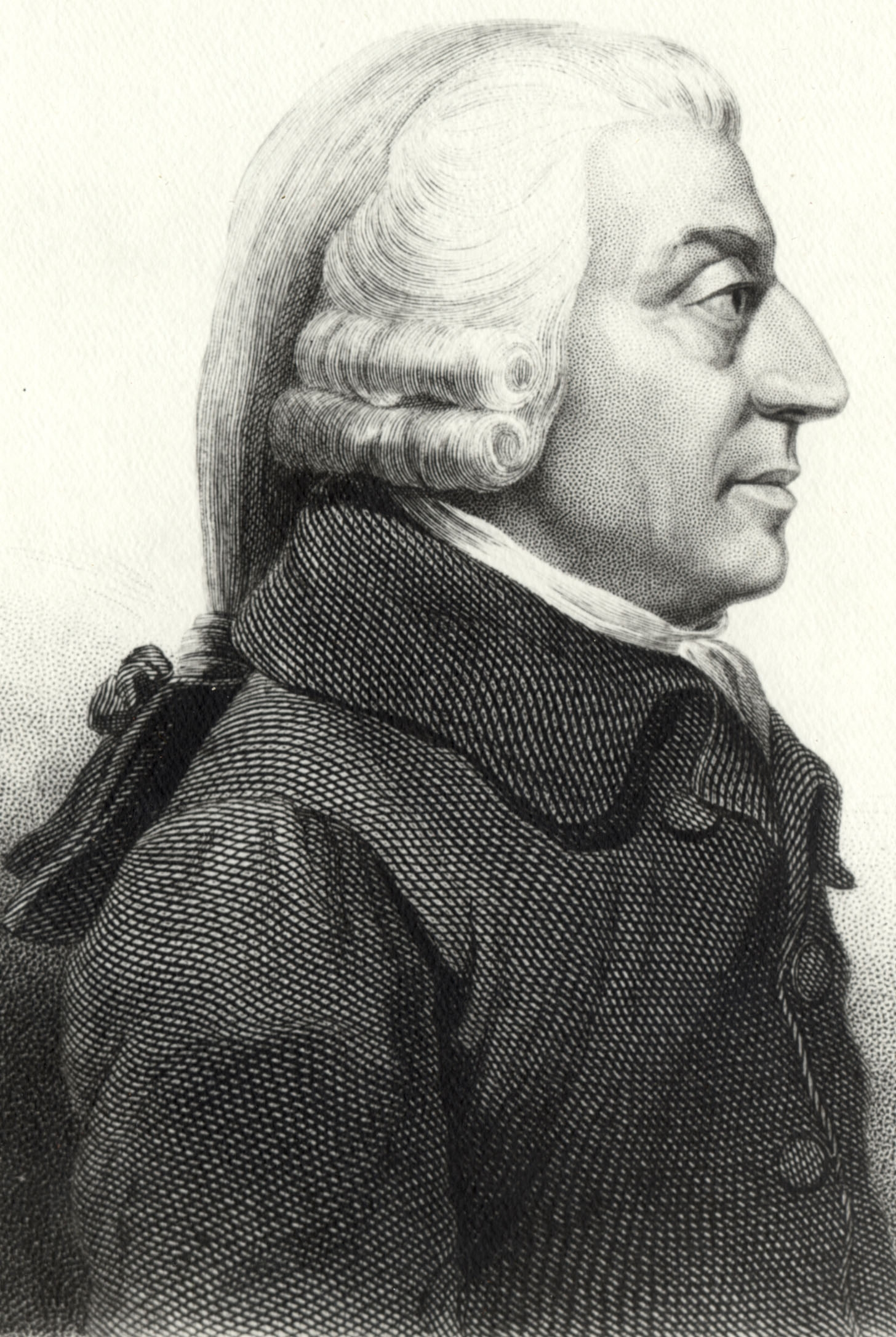
One leader of the Scottish Enlightenment was Adam Smith, the father of modern economic science.

In the Scottish Enlightenment, the principles of sociability, equality, and utility were disseminated in schools and universities, many of which used sophisticated teaching methods which blended philosophy with daily life. Scotland's major cities created an intellectual infrastructure of mutually supporting institutions such as schools, universities, reading societies, libraries, periodicals, museums, and Masonic lodges.

The Scottish network was "predominantly liberal Calvinist, Newtonian, and 'design' oriented in character which played a major role in the further development of the transatlantic Enlightenment." In France, Voltaire said "we look to Scotland for all our ideas of civilization." The focus of the Scottish Enlightenment ranged from intellectual and economic matters to the specifically scientific as in the work of William Cullen, physician and chemist; James Anderson, agronomist; Joseph Black, physicist and chemist; and James Hutton, the first modern geologist.

==== Anglo-American colonies ====
John Trumbull's Declaration of Independence imagines the drafting committee presenting its work to the Congress.

Several Americans, especially Benjamin Franklin and Thomas Jefferson, played a major role in bringing Enlightenment ideas to the New World and in influencing British and French thinkers. Franklin was influential for his political activism and for his advances in physics. Franklin also broadly encouraged the individual's rights and responsibilities to serve as an educated and informed citizen. He published yearly the widely popular, Poor Richard's Almanack, filled with witty quotes encouraging disciplined self-learning, such as "Early to bed, early to rise, makes a man healthy, wealthy and wise." The cultural exchange during the Enlightenment ran in both directions across the Atlantic. Thinkers such as Paine, Locke, and Rousseau all take Native American cultural practices as examples of natural freedom. The Americans closely followed English and Scottish political ideas, as well as some French thinkers such as Montesquieu. As deists, they were influenced by ideas of John Toland and Matthew Tindal. There was a great emphasis upon liberty, republicanism, and religious tolerance. There was no respect for monarchy or inherited political power. Deists reconciled science and religion by rejecting prophecies, miracles, and biblical theology. Leading deists included Thomas Paine in The Age of Reason and Thomas Jefferson in his short Jefferson Bible, from which he removed all supernatural aspects.

=== The Jewish diaspora ===
The Jewish Enlightenment, or Haskalah (Hebrew: הַשְׂכָּלָה, "education") was an intellectual movement among the Jews of Central and Eastern Europe, with a certain influence on those in Western Europe and the Muslim world. It arose as a defined ideological worldview during the 1770s, and its last stage ended around 1881, with the rise of Jewish nationalism.

The movement advocated against Jewish reclusiveness, encouraged the adoption of prevalent attire over traditional dress, while also working to diminish the authority of traditional community institutions such as rabbinic courts and boards of elders.

=== Netherlands ===
The Dutch Enlightenment began in 1640. During the Early Dutch Enlightenment (1640–1720), many books were translated from Latin, French or English to Dutch, often at the risk of their translators and publishers. By the 1720s, the Dutch Republic had also become a major center for printing and exporting banned books to France. Implanted in Netherlandish culture, vernacular rationalism brought the Dutch to take advantage of the intellectual philosophy the enlightenment spread. The most famous figure of the Dutch Enlightenment was Baruch Spinoza.

=== France ===
The French Enlightenment was influenced by England and in turn influenced other national enlightenments. As worded by Sharon A. Stanley, "the French Enlightenment stands out from other national enlightenments for its unrelenting assault on church leadership and theology."

=== German states ===
Prussia took the lead among the German states in sponsoring the political reforms that Enlightenment thinkers urged absolute rulers to adopt. There were important movements as well in the smaller states of Bavaria, Saxony, Hanover, and the Palatinate. In each case, Enlightenment values became accepted and led to significant political and administrative reforms that laid the groundwork for the creation of modern states. The princes of Saxony, for example, carried out an impressive series of fundamental fiscal, administrative, judicial, educational, cultural, and general economic reforms. The reforms were aided by the country's strong urban structure and influential commercial groups and modernized pre-1789 Saxony along the lines of classic Enlightenment principles.

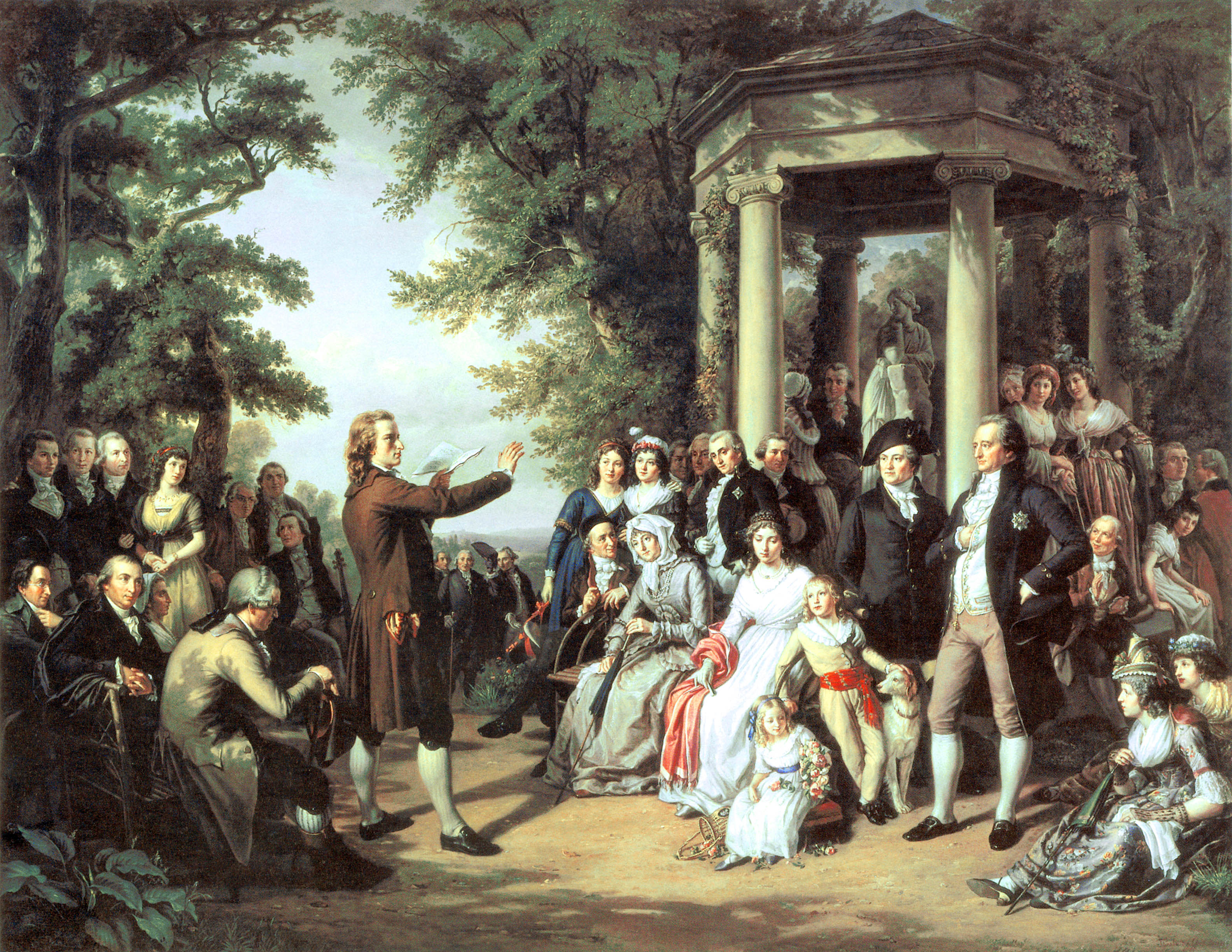
Weimar's Courtyard of the Muses by Theobald von Oer, a tribute to The Enlightenment and the Weimar Classicism depicting German poets Schiller, Wieland, Herder, and Goethe

Before 1750, the German upper classes looked to France for intellectual, cultural, and architectural leadership, as French was the language of high society. By the mid-18th century, the Aufklärung (The Enlightenment) had transformed German high culture in music, philosophy, science, and literature. Christian Wolff was the pioneer as a writer who expounded the Enlightenment to German readers and legitimized German as a philosophic language.

Johann Gottfried von Herder broke new ground in philosophy and poetry, as a leader of the Sturm und Drang movement of proto-Romanticism. Weimar Classicism (Weimarer Klassik) was a cultural and literary movement based in Weimar that sought to establish a new humanism by synthesizing Romantic, classical, and Enlightenment ideas. The movement (from 1772 until 1805) involved Herder as well as polymath Johann Wolfgang von Goethe and Friedrich Schiller, a poet and historian. The theatre principal Abel Seyler greatly influenced the development of German theatre and promoted serious German opera, new works and experimental productions, and the concept of a national theatre. Herder argued that every group of people had its own particular identity, which was expressed in its language and culture. This legitimized the promotion of German language and culture and helped shape the development of German nationalism. Schiller's plays expressed the restless spirit of his generation, depicting the hero's struggle against social pressures and the force of destiny.

German music, sponsored by the upper classes, came of age under composers Johann Sebastian Bach, Joseph Haydn, and Wolfgang Amadeus Mozart.

In remote Königsberg, Kant tried to reconcile rationalism and religious belief, individual freedom, and political authority. Kant's work contained basic tensions that would continue to shape German thought—and indeed all of European philosophy—well into the 20th century. German Enlightenment won the support of princes, aristocrats, and the middle classes, and it permanently reshaped the culture. However, there was a conservatism among the elites that warned against going too far.

In 1788, Prussia issued an "Edict on Religion" that forbade preaching any sermon that undermined popular belief in the Holy Trinity or the Bible. The goal was to avoid theological disputes that might impinge on domestic tranquility. Men who doubted the value of Enlightenment favoured the measure, but so too did many supporters. German universities had created a closed elite that could debate controversial issues among themselves, but spreading them to the public was seen as too risky. This intellectual elite was favoured by the state, but that might be reversed if the process of the Enlightenment proved politically or socially destabilizing.

=== Austria ===
During the 18th century, Austria was under Habsburg rule. The reign of Maria Theresa, the first Habsburg monarch to be considered influenced by the Enlightenment in some areas, was marked by a mix of enlightenment and conservatism. Her son Joseph II's brief reign was marked by this conflict, with his ideology of Josephinism facing opposition. Joseph II carried out numerous reforms in the spirit of the Enlightenment, which affected, for example, the school system, monasteries and the legal system. Emperor Leopold II, who was an early opponent of capital punishment, had a brief and contentious rule that was mostly marked by relations with France. Similarly, Emperor Francis II's rule was primarily marked by relations with France.

The ideas of the Enlightenment also appeared in literature and theater works. Joseph von Sonnenfels was an important representative. In music, Austrian musicians such as Joseph Haydn and Wolfgang Amadeus Mozart were associated with the Enlightenment.

=== Greece and the Greek diaspora ===
The Modern Greek Enlightenment (Greek: Διαφωτισμός, Diafotismós) was the Greek expression of the Enlightenment, characterized by an intellectual and philosophical movement within the Greek community. At this time, many Greeks were dispersed across the Ottoman Empire, with some residing on the Ionian Islands, in Venice, and other parts of Italy.

=== Hungary ===
The Hungarian Enlightenment emerged during the 18th century, while Hungary was part of the Habsburg Empire. The Hungarian Enlightenment is usually said to have begun in 1772 and was greatly influenced by French Enlightenment (through Vienna).

=== Romania ===
The Romanian Enlightenment emerged during the 18th century across the three major historical regions inhabited by Romanians: Transylvania, Wallachia, and Moldavia. At that time, Transylvania was in the Habsburg Empire while Wallachia and Moldavia were vassals of the Ottoman Empire.

The Transylvanian Enlightenment was represented by the Transylvanian School, a group of thinkers who promoted a cultural revival and rights for Romanians (who were marginalized by the Habsburgs).

The Wallachian Enlightenment was represented by such figures as Dinicu Golescu (1777–1830), while the Moldavian Englightenment was headed by prince Dimitrie Cantemir (1673-1723).

=== Switzerland ===
The Enlightenment arrived relatively late in Switzerland, spreading from England, the Netherlands, and France toward the end of the 17th century. The movement initially took hold in Protestant regions, where it gradually replaced orthodox religious thinking. The 1712 victory of the reformed cantons of Zurich and Bern over the five Catholic cantons of central Switzerland in the Second War of Villmergen marked both a Protestant triumph and a victory for Enlightenment ideas in the economically more developed regions.

In Switzerland, which lacked a central court or academy, the Enlightenment spread through the intellectual elite of reformed cities, particularly pastors educated in academies and colleges with strong humanist traditions. The theological "Helvetic triumvirate" of Jean-Alphonse Turrettini (Geneva), Jean-Frédéric Ostervald (Neuchâtel), and Samuel Werenfels (Basel) led their churches toward a humanistic Christianity beginning in 1697, creating what Paul Wernle termed "reasoned orthodoxy" that balanced rational thought with Christian ethics.

Swiss Enlightenment thinkers made significant contributions across multiple fields. The Romand school developed influential theories of natural law, with scholars like Jean Barbeyrac (Lausanne), Jean-Jacques Burlamaqui (Geneva), and Emer de Vattel (Neuchâtel) promoting concepts of inalienable rights and justified resistance to tyranny that influenced the American independence movement. In literature, Johann Jakob Bodmer and Johann Jakob Breitinger made Zurich a center of German literary innovation, while Albert von Haller's poetry represented the peak of Swiss Enlightenment literature. Jean-Jacques Rousseau, considering himself both a Genevan and Swiss citizen, developed democratic republican theories that extended Genevan models to broader European federalist principles.

The movement was characterized by what scholars term "Helvetism" – specifically Swiss aspects including a Christian conception of natural law, patriotic ethics, and philosophical approaches grounded in practical pedagogy and economics. Most distinctively, Swiss Enlightenment thought celebrated Alpine nature, viewing Switzerland as the "land of shepherds" whose republican and federalist traditions were shaped by its mountain environment. The movement organized through numerous societies and publications, including the Encyclopédie d'Yverdon (1770-1780), which offered a moderate alternative to the French Encyclopédie. Swiss intellectuals gained international prominence, with many serving in foreign academies, particularly in Berlin under Frederick II and in St. Petersburg under Catherine II.

=== Italy ===
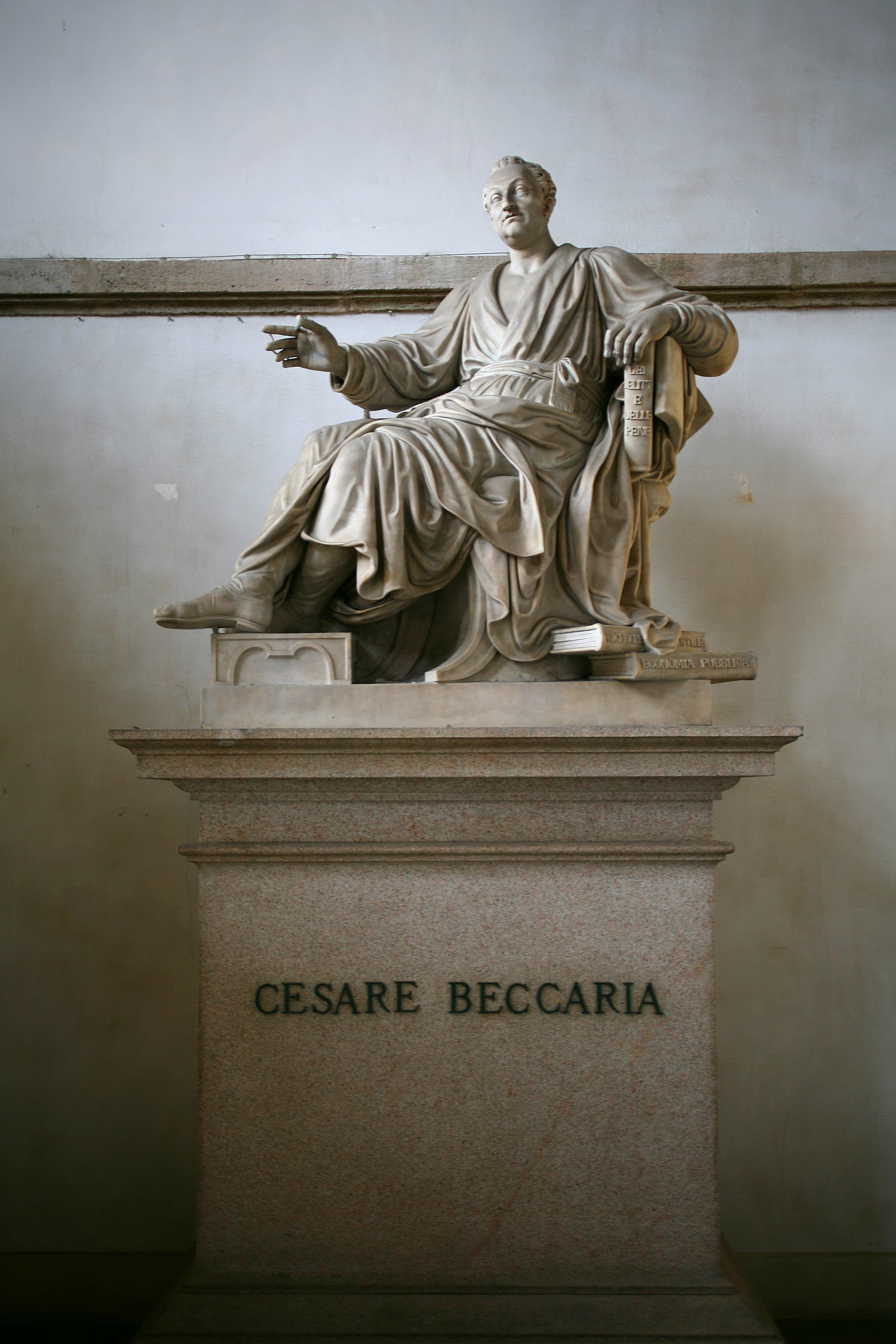
Statue of Cesare Beccaria, considered one of the greatest thinkers of the Enlightenment

In Italy, the main centers of diffusion of the Enlightenment were Naples and Milan: in both cities the intellectuals took public office and collaborated with the Bourbon and Habsburg administrations. In Naples, Antonio Genovesi, Ferdinando Galiani, and Gaetano Filangieri were active under the tolerant King Charles of Bourbon. However, the Neapolitan Enlightenment, like Vico's philosophy, remained almost always in the theoretical field. Only later, many Enlighteners animated the unfortunate experience of the Parthenopean Republic. In Milan, however, the movement strove to find concrete solutions to problems. The center of discussions was the magazine Il Caffè (1762–1766), founded by brothers Pietro and Alessandro Verri (famous philosophers and writers, as well as their brother Giovanni), who also gave life to the Accademia dei Pugni, founded in 1761. Minor centers were Tuscany, Veneto, and Piedmont, where among others, Pompeo Neri worked.

From Naples, Genovesi influenced a generation of southern Italian intellectuals and university students. His textbook Della diceosina, o sia della Filosofia del Giusto e dell'Onesto (1766) was a controversial attempt to mediate between the history of moral philosophy on the one hand and the specific problems encountered by 18th-century commercial society on the other. It contained the greater part of Genovesi's political, philosophical, and economic thought, which became a guidebook for Neapolitan economic and social development.

Science flourished as Alessandro Volta and Luigi Galvani made break-through discoveries in electricity. Pietro Verri was a leading economist in Lombardy. Historian Joseph Schumpeter states he was "the most important pre-Smithian authority on Cheapness-and-Plenty." The most influential scholar on the Italian Enlightenment has been Franco Venturi. Italy also produced some of the Enlightenment's greatest legal theorists, including Cesare Beccaria, Giambattista Vico, and Francesco Mario Pagano.

=== Bourbon Spain and Spanish America ===
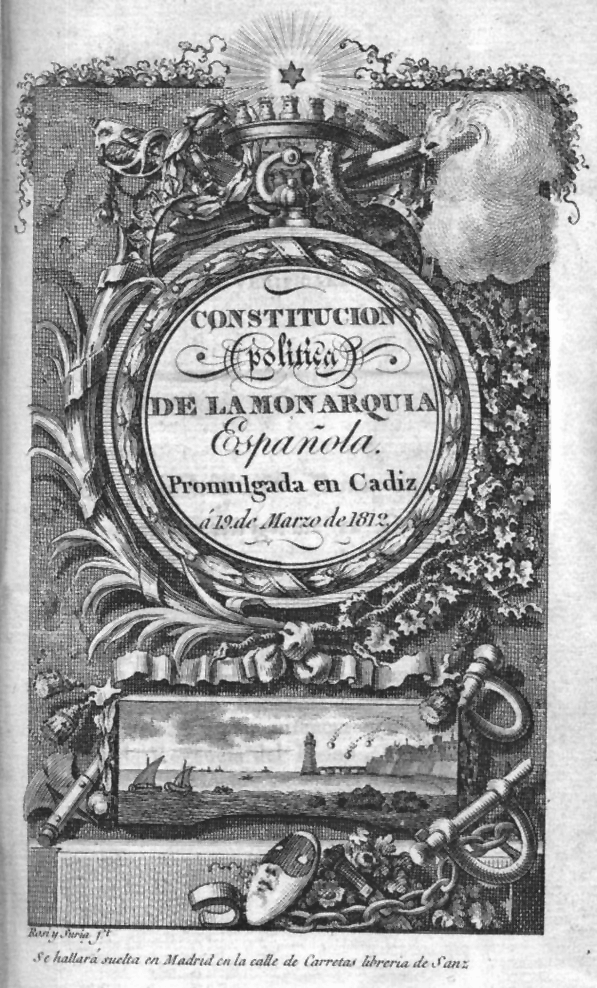
Spanish Constitution of 1812

When Charles II, the last Spanish Habsburg monarch, died his successor was from the French House of Bourbon, initiating a period of French Enlightenment influence in Spain and the Spanish Empire.

In the 18th Century, the Spanish continued to expand their empire in the Americas with the Spanish missions in California and established missions deeper inland in South America. Under Charles III, the crown began to implement serious structural changes. The monarchy curtailed the power of the Catholic Church, and established a standing military in Spanish America. Freer trade was promoted under comercio libre in which regions could trade with companies sailing from any other Spanish port, rather than the restrictive mercantile system. The crown sent out scientific expeditions to assert Spanish sovereignty over territories it claimed but did not control, but also importantly to discover the economic potential of its far-flung empire. Botanical expeditions sought plants that could be of use to the empire. Charles IV gave Prussian scientist Alexander von Humboldt free rein to travel in Spanish America, usually closed to foreigners, and more importantly, access to crown officials to aid the success of his scientific expedition.

When Napoleon invaded Spain in 1808, Ferdinand VII abdicated and Napoleon placed his brother Joseph Bonaparte on the throne. To add legitimacy to this move, the Bayonne Constitution was promulgated, which included representation from Spain's overseas components, but most Spaniards rejected the whole Napoleonic project. A war of national resistance erupted. The Cortes de Cádiz (parliament) was convened to rule Spain in the absence of the legitimate monarch, Ferdinand. It created a new governing document, the Constitution of 1812, which laid out three branches of government: executive, legislative, and judicial; put limits on the king by creating a constitutional monarchy; defined citizens as those in the Spanish Empire without African ancestry; established universal manhood suffrage; and established public education starting with primary school through university as well as freedom of expression. The constitution was in effect from 1812 until 1814, when Napoleon was defeated and Ferdinand was restored to the throne of Spain. Upon his return, Ferdinand repudiated the constitution and reestablished absolutist rule.

=== Haiti ===
The Haitian Revolution began in 1791 and ended in 1804 and shows how Enlightenment ideas "were part of complex transcultural flows." Radical ideas in Paris during and after the French Revolution were mobilized in Haiti, such as by Toussaint Louverture. Toussaint had read the critique of European colonialism in Guillaume Thomas François Raynal's book Histoire des deux Indes and "was particularly impressed by Raynal's prediction of the coming of a 'Black Spartacus.'"

The revolution combined Enlightenment ideas with the experiences of the slaves in Haiti, two-thirds of whom had been born in Africa and could "draw on specific notions of kingdom and just government from West and Central Africa, and to employ religious practices such as voodoo for the formation of revolutionary communities." The revolution also affected France and "forced the French National Convention to abolish slavery in 1794."

=== Portugal and Brazil ===
The Portuguese Enlightenment was heavily marked by the rule of Prime Minister Marquis of Pombal under King Joseph I from 1756 to 1777. Following the 1755 Lisbon earthquake which destroyed a large part of Lisbon, the Marquis of Pombal implemented important economic policies to regulate commercial activity (in particular with Brazil and England), and to standardise quality throughout the country (for example by introducing the first integrated industries in Portugal). His reconstruction of Lisbon's riverside district in straight and perpendicular streets (the Lisbon Baixa), methodically organized to facilitate commerce and exchange (for example by assigning to each street a different product or service), can be seen as a direct application of the Enlightenment ideas to governance and urbanism. His urbanistic ideas, also being the first large-scale example of earthquake engineering, became collectively known as Pombaline style, and were implemented throughout the kingdom during his stay in office. His governance was as enlightened as ruthless, see for example the Távora affair.

In literature, the first Enlightenment ideas in Portugal can be traced back to the diplomat, philosopher, and writer António Vieira who spent a considerable amount of his life in colonial Brazil denouncing discriminations against New Christians and the indigenous peoples in Brazil. During the 18th century, enlightened literary movements such as the Arcádia Lusitana (lasting from 1756 until 1776, then replaced by the Nova Arcádia in 1790 until 1794) surfaced in the academic medium, in particular involving former students of the University of Coimbra. A distinct member of this group was the poet Manuel Maria Barbosa du Bocage. The physician António Nunes Ribeiro Sanches was also an important Enlightenment figure, contributing to the Encyclopédie and being part of the Russian court. The ideas of the Enlightenment influenced various economists and anti-colonial intellectuals throughout the Portuguese Empire, such as José de Azeredo Coutinho, José da Silva Lisboa, Cláudio Manoel da Costa, and Tomás Antônio Gonzaga.

The Napoleonic invasion of Portugal had consequences for the Portuguese monarchy. With the aid of the British navy, the Portuguese royal family was evacuated to Brazil, its most important colony. Even though Napoleon had been defeated, the royal court remained in Brazil. The Liberal Revolution of 1820 forced the return of the royal family to Portugal. The terms by which the restored king was to rule was a constitutional monarchy under the Constitution of Portugal. Brazil declared its independence from Portugal in 1822 and became a monarchy.

=== Sweden ===
The existence of a Swedish Enlightenment has been debated by scholars. According to Tore Frängsmyr, the Swedish Enlightenment "never formed a truly coherent current of ideas or became a unified movement." As worded by Max Skjönsberg,

Frängsmyr's main arguments against a Swedish Enlightenment were that religious criticism in Sweden was reserved for foreign Catholicism rather than the domestic Lutheran Church and that the debate about freedom in the 1750s and 1760s focused on political economy and freedom to trade rather than freedom to 'philosophize'. The fact that political economy is now a much more important aspect of Enlightenment historiography, to a great degree thanks to research on the Scottish Enlightenment, is a clear example of why Frängsmyr's case is in need of revision.

Between 1718 and 1772, the Swedish Enlightenment overlapped with the period of parliamentary rule known in Swedish history as the Age of Liberty.

=== Russia ===
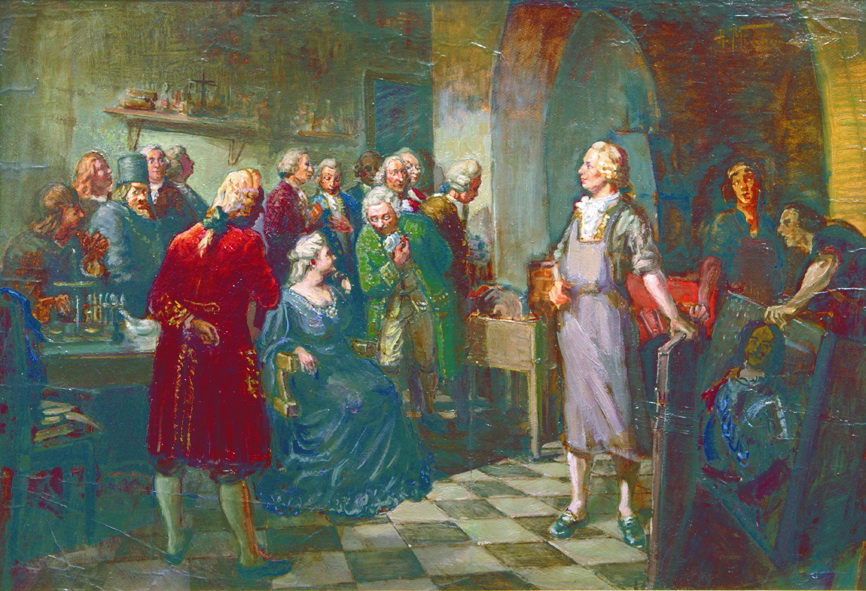
Empress Elizabeth visits Russian scientist Mikhail Lomonosov.

In Russia, the government began to actively encourage the proliferation of arts and sciences in the mid-18th century. This era produced the first Russian university, library, theatre, public museum, and independent press. Like other enlightened despots, Catherine the Great played a key role in fostering the arts, sciences and education. She used her own interpretation of Enlightenment ideals, assisted by notable international experts such as Voltaire (by correspondence) and in residence world class scientists such as Leonhard Euler and Peter Simon Pallas. The national Enlightenment differed from its Western European counterpart in that it promoted further modernization of all aspects of Russian life and was concerned with attacking the institution of serfdom in Russia. The Russian Enlightenment centered on the individual instead of societal enlightenment and encouraged the living of an enlightened life. A powerful element was prosveshchenie which combined religious piety, erudition, and commitment to the spread of learning. However, it lacked the skeptical and critical spirit of the Western European Enlightenment.

=== Poland and Lithuania ===
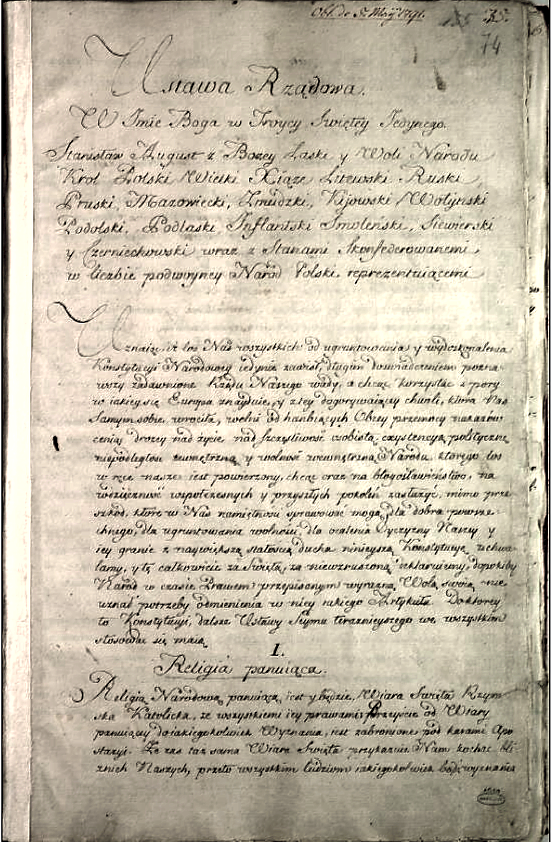
Polish–Lithuanian Constitution of 1791, Europe's first modern constitution

Enlightenment ideas (oświecenie) emerged late in Poland, as the Polish middle class was weaker and szlachta (nobility) culture (Sarmatism) together with the Polish–Lithuanian Commonwealth political system (Golden Liberty) were in deep crisis. The political system was built on aristocratic republicanism, but was unable to defend itself against powerful neighbors Russia, Prussia, and Austria as they repeatedly sliced off regions until nothing was left of independent Poland. The Polish Enlightenment began in the 1730s–40s and especially in theatre and the arts peaked in the reign of King Stanisław August Poniatowski (second half of the 18th century).

Warsaw was a main centre after 1750, with an expansion of schools and educational institutions and the arts patronage held at the Royal Castle. Leaders promoted tolerance and more education. They included King Stanislaw II August and reformers Piotr Switkowski, Antoni Poplawski, Josef Niemcewicz, and Jósef Pawlinkowski, as well as Baudouin de Cortenay, a Polonized dramatist. Opponents included Florian Jaroszewicz, Gracjan Piotrowski, Karol Wyrwicz, and Wojciech Skarszewski. The movement went into decline with the Third Partition of Poland (1795) – a national tragedy inspiring a short period of sentimental writing – and ended in 1822, replaced by Romanticism.

=== China ===
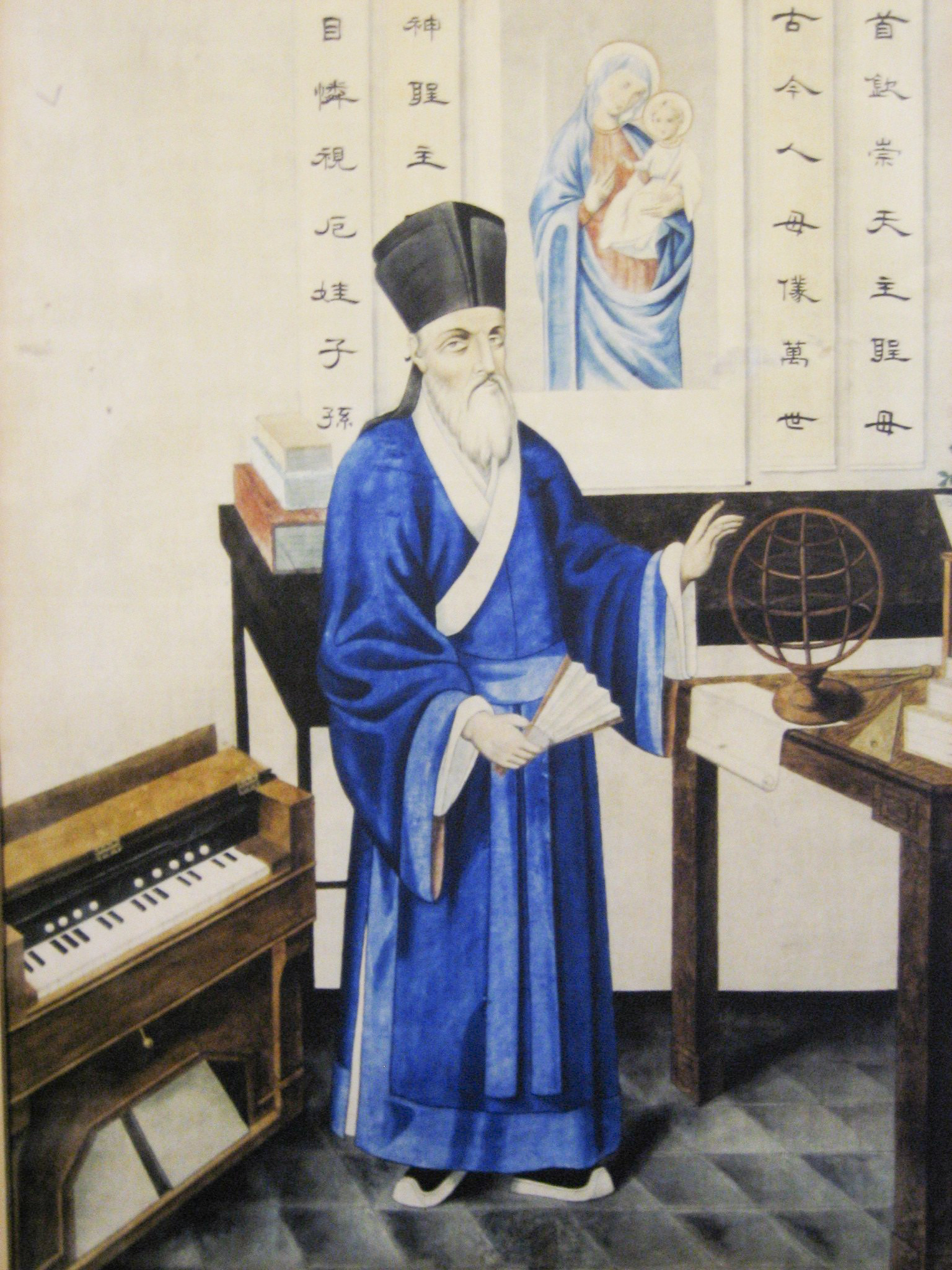
Italian Jesuit priest Matteo Ricci worked with several Chinese elites, such as Xu Guangqi, in translating Euclid's Elements into Chinese.

Eighteenth-century China experienced "a trend towards seeing fewer dragons and miracles, not unlike the disenchantment that began to spread across the Europe of the Enlightenment." Furthermore, "some of the developments that we associate with Europe's Enlightenment resemble events in China remarkably." During this time, ideals of Chinese society were reflected in "the reign of the Qing emperors Kangxi and Qianlong; China was posited as the incarnation of an enlightened and meritocratic society—and instrumentalized for criticisms of absolutist rule in Europe."

=== Japan ===
From 1641 to 1853, the Tokugawa shogunate of Japan enforced a policy called kaikin. The policy prohibited foreign contact with most outside countries. Robert Bellah found "origins of modern Japan in certain strands of Confucian thinking, a 'functional analogue to the Protestant Ethic' that Max Weber singled out as the driving force behind Western capitalism." Japanese Confucian and Enlightenment ideas were brought together, for example, in the work of the Japanese reformer Tsuda Mamichi in the 1870s, who said, "Whenever we open our mouths...it is to speak of 'enlightenment.'"

In Japan and much of East Asia, Confucian ideas were not replaced but "ideas associated with the Enlightenment were instead fused with the existing cosmology—which in turn was refashioned under conditions of global interaction." In Japan in particular, the term ri, which is the Confucian idea of "order and harmony on human society" also came to represent "the idea of laissez-faire and the rationality of market exchange." By the 1880s, the slogan "Civilization and Enlightenment" became potent throughout Japan, China, and Korea and was employed to address challenges of globalization.

=== Korea ===
During this time, Korea "aimed at isolation" and was known as the "hermit kingdom" but became awakened to Enlightenment ideas by the 1890s such as with the activities of the Independence Club. Korea was influenced by China and Japan but also found its own Enlightenment path with the Korean intellectual Yu Kilchun who popularized the term Enlightenment throughout Korea. The use of Enlightenment ideas was a "response to a specific situation in Korea in the 1890s, and not a belated answer to Voltaire."

=== India ===
In 18th-century India, Tipu Sultan was an enlightened monarch, who "was one of the founding members of the (French) Jacobin Club in Seringapatam, had planted a liberty tree, and asked to be addressed as 'Tipu Citoyen,'" which means Citizen Tipu. In parts of India, an important movement called the "Bengal Renaissance" led to Enlightenment reforms beginning in the 1820s. Ram Mohan Roy was a reformer who "fused different traditions in his project of social reform that made him a proponent of a 'religion of reason.'"

=== Egypt ===
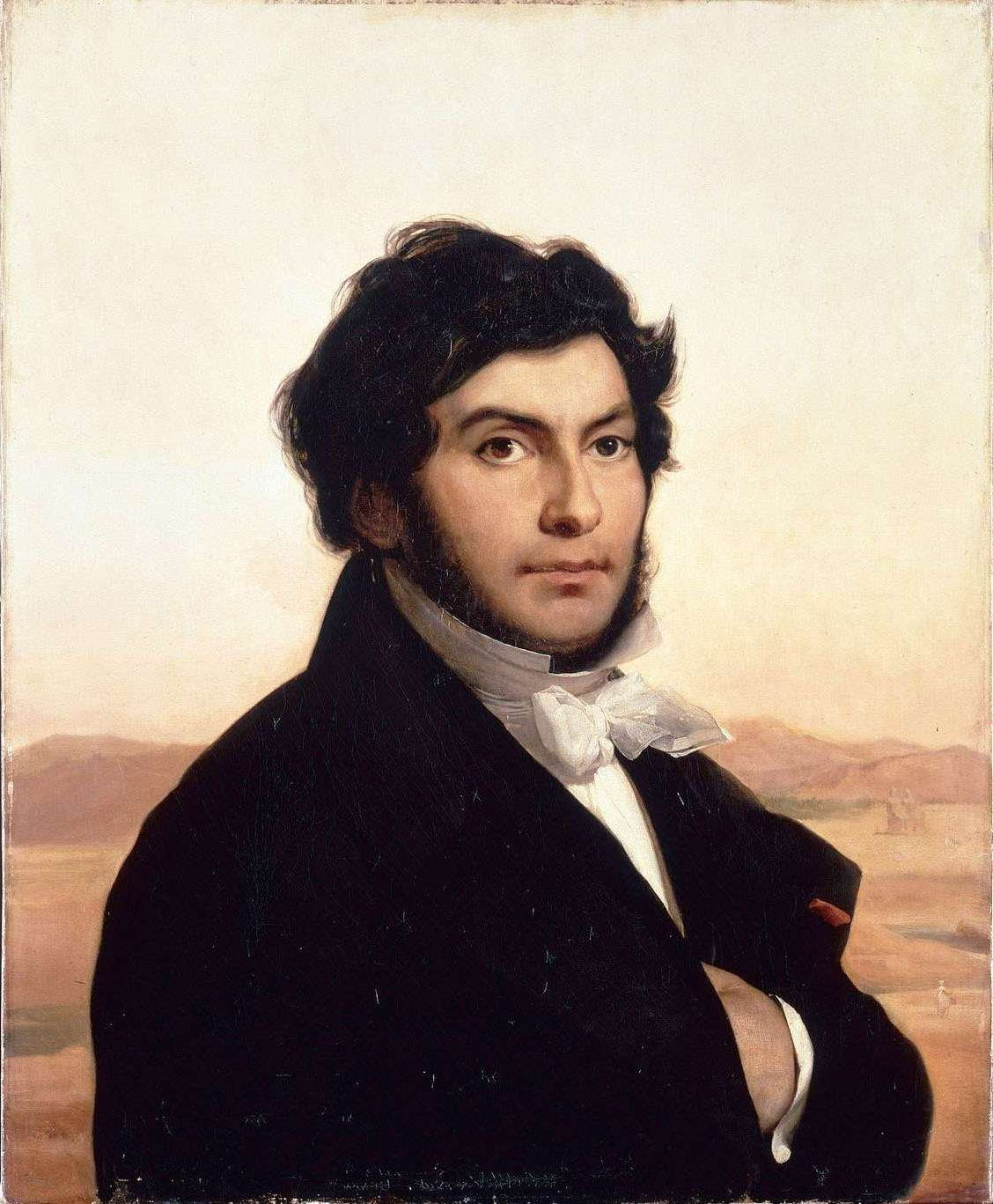
Jean-François Champollion, the founder of Egyptology

Eighteenth-century Egypt had "a form of 'cultural revival' in the making—specifically Islamic origins of modernization long before Napoleon's Egyptian campaign." Napoleon's expedition into Egypt further encouraged "social transformations that harkened back to debates about inner-Islamic reform, but now were also legitimized by referring to the authority of the Enlightenment." A major intellectual influence on Islamic modernism and expanding the Enlightenment in Egypt, Rifa al-Tahtawi "oversaw the publication of hundreds of European works in the Arabic language."

=== Ottoman Empire ===
The Enlightenment began to influence the Ottoman Empire in the 1830s and continued into the late 19th century. The Tanzimat was a period of reform in the Ottoman Empire that began with the Gülhane Hatt-ı Şerif in 1839 and ended with the First Constitutional Era in 1876.

Namık Kemal, a political activist and member of the Young Ottomans, drew on major Enlightenment thinkers and "a variety of intellectual resources in his quest for social and political reform." In 1893, Kemal responded to Ernest Renan, who had indicted the Islamic religion, with his own version of the Enlightenment, which "was not a poor copy of French debates in the eighteenth century, but an original position responding to the exigencies of Ottoman society in the late nineteenth century."

=== The Arab world ===
The Arab Enlightenment, or Nahda (Arabic: النّهضة, "the awakening"), was a cultural movement in Arab-populated regions of the Ottoman Empire such as Egypt, Lebanon, Syria, and Tunisia, during the second half of the 19th century and the early 20th century. The Nahda is often traced to the cultural shock of the French invasion of Egypt and Syria in 1798, and the reformist drive of subsequent rulers such as Muhammad Ali of Egypt.

== Historiography ==
The idea of the Enlightenment has always been contested territory. According to Keith Thomas, its supporters "hail it as the source of everything that is progressive about the modern world. For them, it stands for freedom of thought, rational inquiry, critical thinking, religious tolerance, political liberty, scientific achievement, the pursuit of happiness, and hope for the future." Thomas adds that its detractors accuse it of shallow rationalism, naïve optimism, unrealistic universalism, and moral darkness. From the start, conservative and clerical defenders of traditional religion attacked materialism and skepticism as evil forces that encouraged immorality. By 1794, they pointed to the Reign of Terror during the French Revolution as confirmation of their predictions.

Romantic philosophers argued that the Enlightenment's excessive dependence on reason was a mistake that it perpetuated, disregarding the bonds of history, myth, faith, and tradition that were necessary to hold society together. Ritchie Robertson portrays it as a grand intellectual and political program, offering a "science" of society modeled on the powerful physical laws of Newton. "Social science" was seen as the instrument of human improvement. It would expose truth and expand human happiness.

The rights of women and non-White people were generally overlooked in Enlightenment philosophy, which is often explicitly Eurocentric. Scientific racism first emerged at this time, bringing together traditional racism and new research methods. During the Enlightenment, concepts of monogenism and polygenism became popular, though they would only be systematized epistemologically during the 19th century. Monogenism contends that all races have a single origin, while polygenism is the idea that each race has a separate origin. Until the 18th century, the words "race" and "species" were interchangeable. The classification of non-European peoples as sub-human and irrational served to justify European dominance. (Note: Michèle Duchet was a pioneer in highlighting the darker aspects of the Enlightenment. She focussed on refuting the myth of anti-colonialism in Enlightenment thought, stating that the criticisms sought to preserve European neo-colonial rule, rather than having been based on humanistic ideals.)

=== Definition ===
The term "Enlightenment" emerged in English in the latter part of the 19th century, with particular reference to French philosophy, as the equivalent of the French term Lumières (used first by Jean-Baptiste Dubos in 1733 and already well established by 1751). From Kant's 1784 essay "Beantwortung der Frage: Was ist Aufklärung?" ("Answering the Question: What is Enlightenment?"), the German term became Aufklärung (aufklären = to illuminate; sich aufklären = to clear up). However, scholars have never agreed on a definition of the Enlightenment or on its chronological or geographical extent. Terms like les Lumières (French), illuminismo (Italian), ilustración (Spanish) and Aufklärung (German) referred to partly overlapping movements. Not until the late 19th century did English scholars agree they were talking about "the Enlightenment."

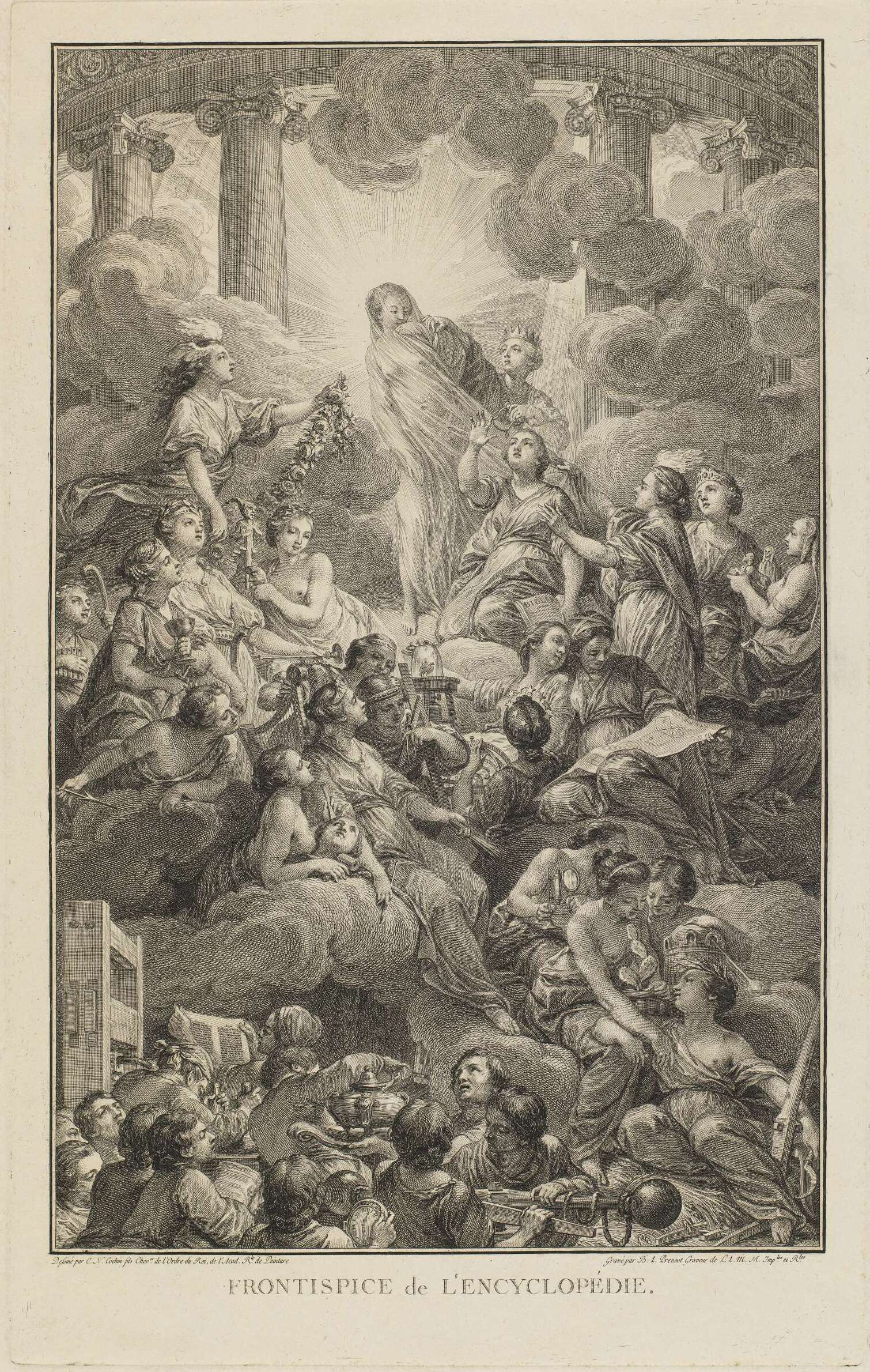
If there is something you know, communicate it. If there is something you don't know, search for it. — An engraving from the 1772 edition of the Encyclopédie; Truth, in the top center, is surrounded by light and unveiled by the figures to the right, Philosophy and Reason

Enlightenment historiography began in the period itself, from what Enlightenment figures said about their work. A dominant element was the intellectual angle they took. Jean le Rond d'Alembert's Preliminary Discourse of l'Encyclopédie provides a history of the Enlightenment which comprises a chronological list of developments in the realm of knowledge—of which the Encyclopédie forms the pinnacle. In 1783, Mendelssohn referred to Enlightenment as a process by which man was educated in the use of reason. (Note: The past tense is used deliberately as whether man would educate himself or be educated by certain exemplary figures was a common issue at the time. D'Alembert's introduction to l'Encyclopédie, for example, along with Immanuel Kant's essay response (the "independent thinkers"), both support the later model.) Kant called Enlightenment "man's release from his self-incurred tutelage," tutelage being "man's inability to make use of his understanding without direction from another." "For Kant, Enlightenment was mankind's final coming of age, the emancipation of the human consciousness from an immature state of ignorance." The German scholar Ernst Cassirer called the Enlightenment "a part and a special phase of that whole intellectual development through which modern philosophic thought gained its characteristic self-confidence and self-consciousness." According to historian Roy Porter, the liberation of the human mind from a dogmatic state of ignorance, is the epitome of what the Enlightenment was trying to capture.

Bertrand Russell saw the Enlightenment as a phase in a progressive development which began in antiquity and that reason and challenges to the established order were constant ideals throughout that time. Russell said that the Enlightenment was ultimately born out of the Protestant reaction against the Catholic Counter-Reformation and that philosophical views such as affinity for democracy against monarchy originated among 16th-century Protestants to justify their desire to break away from the Catholic Church. Although many of these philosophical ideals were picked up by Catholics, Russell argues that by the 18th century the Enlightenment was the principal manifestation of the schism that began with Martin Luther.

Jonathan Israel rejects the attempts of postmodern and Marxian historians to understand the revolutionary ideas of the period purely as by-products of social and economic transformations. He instead focuses on the history of ideas in the period from 1650 to the end of the 18th century and claims that it was the ideas themselves that caused the change that eventually led to the revolutions of the latter half of the 18th century and the early 19th century. Israel argues that until the 1650s Western civilization "was based on a largely shared core of faith, tradition, and authority."

=== Time span ===
There is little consensus on the beginning of the Enlightenment, though several historians and philosophers argue that it was marked by Descartes' 1637 philosophy of Cogito, ergo sum ("I think, therefore I am"), which shifted the epistemological basis from external authority to internal certainty. In France, many cited the publication of Newton's Principia Mathematica (1687), which built upon the work of earlier scientists and formulated the laws of motion and universal gravitation. French historians usually place the Siècle des Lumières ("Century of Enlightenments") between 1715 and 1789: from the beginning of the reign of Louis XV until the French Revolution. Most scholars use the last years of the century, often choosing the French Revolution or the beginning of the Napoleonic Wars (1804) as a convenient point in time with which to date the end of the Enlightenment.

In recent years, scholars have expanded the time span and global perspective of the Enlightenment by examining: (1) how European intellectuals did not work alone and other people helped spread and adapt Enlightenment ideas, (2) how Enlightenment ideas were "a response to cross-border interaction and global integration," and (3) how the Enlightenment "continued throughout the nineteenth century and beyond." The Enlightenment "was not merely a history of diffusion" and "was the work of historical actors around the world... who invoked the term... for their own specific purposes."

=== Modern study ===
In their 1947 book Dialectic of Enlightenment, Frankfurt School philosophers Max Horkheimer and Theodor W. Adorno, both wartime exiles from Nazi Germany, critiqued the supposed rational basis of the modern world:

Enlightenment, understood in the widest sense as the advance of thought, has always aimed at liberating human beings from fear and installing them as masters. Yet the wholly enlightened earth radiates under the sign of disaster triumphant.

Extending Horkheimer and Adorno's argument, intellectual historian Jason Josephson Storm argues that any idea of the Enlightenment as a clearly defined period that is separate from the earlier Renaissance and later Romanticism or Counter-Enlightenment constitutes a myth. Storm points out that there are vastly different and mutually contradictory periodizations of the Enlightenment depending on nation, field of study, and school of thought; that the term and category of "Enlightenment" referring to the Scientific Revolution was actually applied after the fact; that the Enlightenment did not see an increase in disenchantment or the dominance of the mechanistic worldview; and that a blur in the early modern ideas of the humanities and natural sciences makes it hard to circumscribe a Scientific Revolution. Storm defends his categorization of the Enlightenment as "myth" by noting the regulative role ideas of a period of Enlightenment and disenchantment play in modern Western culture, such that belief in magic, spiritualism, and even religion appears somewhat taboo in intellectual strata.

In the 1970s, study of the Enlightenment expanded to include the ways Enlightenment ideas spread to European colonies and how they interacted with indigenous cultures and how the Enlightenment took place in formerly unstudied areas such as Italy, Greece, the Balkans, Poland, Hungary, and Russia. Intellectuals such as Robert Darnton and Jürgen Habermas have focused on the social conditions of the Enlightenment. Habermas described the creation of the "bourgeois public sphere" in 18th-century Europe, containing the new venues and modes of communication allowing for rational exchange. Habermas said that the public sphere was bourgeois, egalitarian, rational, and independent from the state, making it the ideal venue for intellectuals to critically examine contemporary politics and society, away from the interference of established authority. While the public sphere is generally an integral component of the social study of the Enlightenment, other historians (Note: e.g. Robert Darnton, Roger Chartier, Brian Cowan, Donna T. Andrew.) have questioned whether the public sphere had these characteristics.

Another area of study is the impact of the European exploration or colonization of other societies, and the underrepresented influence of ideas from thinkers of other regions, such as indigenous Americans whose critiques of European society influenced European intellectuals.

== Society and culture ==
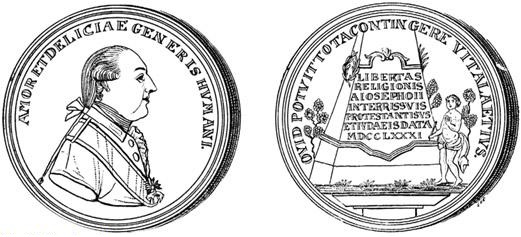
A medal minted during the reign of Joseph II, Holy Roman Emperor, commemorating his grant of religious liberty to Jews and Protestants in Hungary—another important reform of Joseph II was the abolition of serfdom.

In contrast to the intellectual historiographical approach of the Enlightenment, which examines the various currents or discourses of intellectual thought within the European context during the 17th and 18th centuries, the cultural (or social) approach examines the changes that occurred in European society and culture. This approach studies the process of changing sociabilities and cultural practices during the Enlightenment.

One of the primary elements of the culture of the Enlightenment was the rise of the public sphere, a "realm of communication marked by new arenas of debate, more open and accessible forms of urban public space and sociability, and an explosion of print culture," in the late 17th century and 18th century. Elements of the public sphere included that it was egalitarian, that it discussed the domain of "common concern," and that argument was founded on reason. Habermas uses the term "common concern" to describe those areas of political/social knowledge and discussion that were previously the exclusive territory of the state and religious authorities, now open to critical examination by the public sphere. The values of this bourgeois public sphere included holding reason to be supreme, considering everything to be open to criticism (the public sphere is critical), and the opposition of secrecy of all sorts.

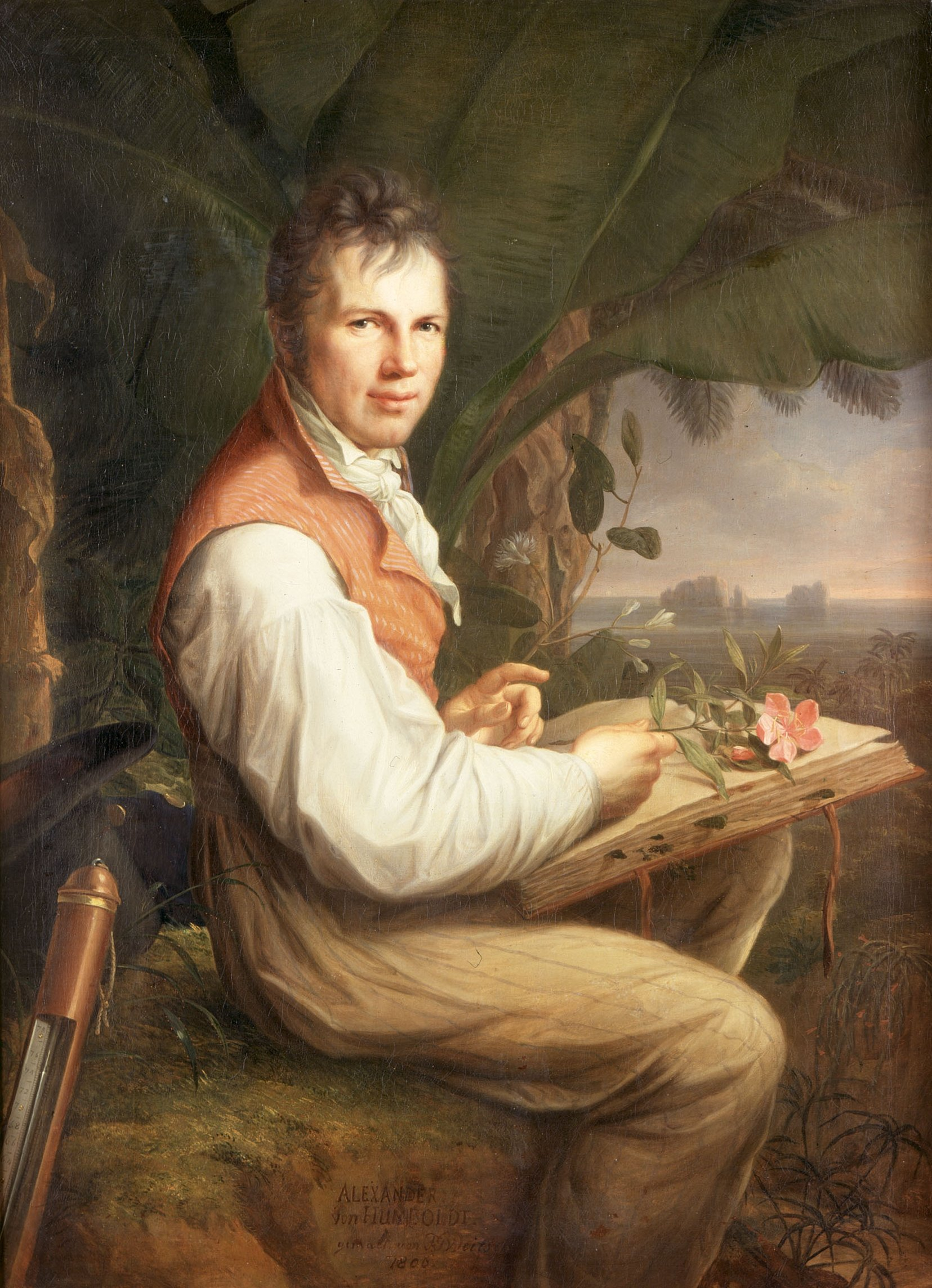
German explorer Alexander von Humboldt showed his disgust for slavery and often criticized the colonial policies—he always acted out of a deeply humanistic conviction, borne by the ideas of the Enlightenment.

The creation of the public sphere has been associated with two long-term historical trends: the rise of the modern nation state and the rise of capitalism. The modern nation state in its consolidation of public power created by counterpoint a private realm of society independent of the state, which allowed for the public sphere. Capitalism also increased society's autonomy and self-awareness, as well as an increasing need for the exchange of information. As the nascent public sphere expanded, it embraced a large variety of institutions, and the most commonly cited were coffee houses and cafés, salons and the literary public sphere, figuratively localized in the Republic of Letters. In France, the creation of the public sphere was helped by the aristocracy's move from the king's palace at Versailles to Paris in about 1720, since their rich spending stimulated the trade in luxuries and artistic creations, especially fine paintings.

The context for the rise of the public sphere was the economic and social change commonly associated with the Industrial Revolution: "Economic expansion, increasing urbanization, rising population and improving communications in comparison to the stagnation of the previous century." Rising efficiency in production techniques and communication lowered the prices of consumer goods and increased the amount and variety of goods available to consumers (including the literature essential to the public sphere). Meanwhile, the colonial experience (most European states had colonial empires in the 18th century) began to expose European society to extremely heterogeneous cultures, leading to the breaking down of "barriers between cultural systems, religious divides, gender differences and geographical areas."

The word "public" implies the highest level of inclusivity—the public sphere by definition should be open to all. However, this sphere was only public to relative degrees. Enlightenment thinkers frequently contrasted their conception of the "public" with that of the people: Condorcet contrasted "opinion" with populace, Marmontel "the opinion of men of letters" with "the opinion of the multitude" and d'Alembert the "truly enlightened public" with "the blind and noisy multitude." Additionally, most institutions of the public sphere excluded both women and the lower classes. Cross-class influences occurred through noble and lower class participation in areas such as the coffeehouses and the Masonic lodges.

=== Implications in the arts ===
Because of the focus on reason over superstition, the Enlightenment cultivated the arts. Emphasis on learning, art, and music became more widespread, especially with the growing middle class. Areas of study such as literature, philosophy, science, and the fine arts increasingly explored subject matter to which the general public, in addition to the previously more segregated professionals and patrons, could relate.

George Frideric Handel

As musicians depended more on public support, public concerts became increasingly popular and helped supplement performers' and composers' incomes. The concerts also helped them to reach a wider audience. Handel, for example, epitomized this with his highly public musical activities in London. He gained considerable fame there with performances of his operas and oratorios. The music of Haydn and Mozart, with their Viennese Classical styles, are usually regarded as being the most in line with the Enlightenment ideals.

The desire to explore, record, and systematize knowledge had a meaningful impact on music publications. Rousseau's Dictionnaire de musique (published 1767 in Geneva and 1768 in Paris) was a leading text in the late 18th century. This widely available dictionary gave short definitions of words like genius and taste and was clearly influenced by the Enlightenment movement. Another text influenced by Enlightenment values was Charles Burney's A General History of Music: From the Earliest Ages to the Present Period (1776), which was a historical survey and an attempt to rationalize elements in music systematically over time. Recently, musicologists have shown renewed interest in the ideas and consequences of the Enlightenment. For example, Rose Rosengard Subotnik's Deconstructive Variations (subtitled Music and Reason in Western Society) compares Mozart's Die Zauberflöte (1791) using the Enlightenment and Romantic perspectives and concludes that the work is "an ideal musical representation of the Enlightenment."

As the economy and the middle class expanded, there was an increasing number of amateur musicians. One manifestation of this involved women, who became more involved with music on a social level. Women were already engaged in professional roles as singers and increased their presence in the amateur performers' scene, especially with keyboard music. Music publishers began to print music that amateurs could understand and play. The majority of the works that were published were for keyboard, voice and keyboard, and chamber ensemble. After these initial genres were popularized, from the mid-century on, amateur groups sang choral music, which then became a new trend for publishers to capitalize on. The increasing study of the fine arts, as well as access to amateur-friendly published works, led to more people becoming interested in reading and discussing music. Music magazines, reviews, and critical works which suited amateurs as well as connoisseurs began to surface.

== Dissemination of ideas ==
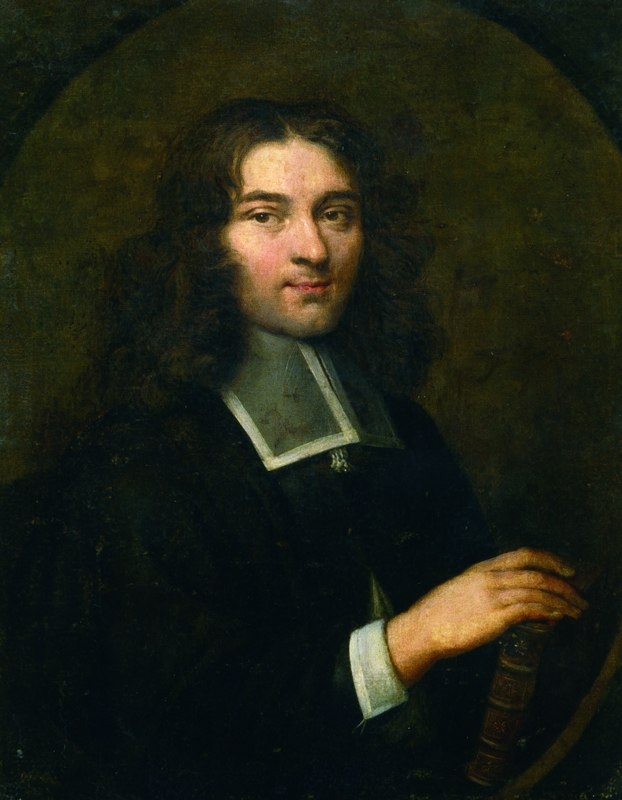
French philosopher Pierre Bayle

The philosophes spent a great deal of energy disseminating their ideas among educated men and women in cosmopolitan cities. They used many venues, some of them quite new.

=== Republic of Letters ===
The term "Republic of Letters" was coined in 1664 by Pierre Bayle in his journal Nouvelles de la Republique des Lettres (News from the Republic of Letters). Towards the end of the 18th century, the editor of Histoire de la République des Lettres en France (History of the Republic of Letters in France), a literary survey, described the Republic of Letters as being:

In the midst of all the governments that decide the fate of men; in the bosom of so many states, the majority of them despotic ... there exists a certain realm which holds sway only over the mind ... that we honor with the name Republic, because it preserves a measure of independence, and because it is almost its essence to be free. It is the realm of talent and of thought.

The Republic of Letters was the sum of a number of Enlightenment ideals: an egalitarian realm governed by knowledge that could act across political boundaries and rival state power. It was a forum that supported "free public examination of questions regarding religion or legislation". Kant considered written communication essential to his conception of the public sphere; once everyone was a part of the "reading public", then society could be said to be enlightened. The people who participated in the Republic of Letters, such as Diderot and Voltaire, are frequently known today as important Enlightenment figures. Indeed, the men who wrote Diderot's Encyclopédie arguably formed a microcosm of the larger "republic".

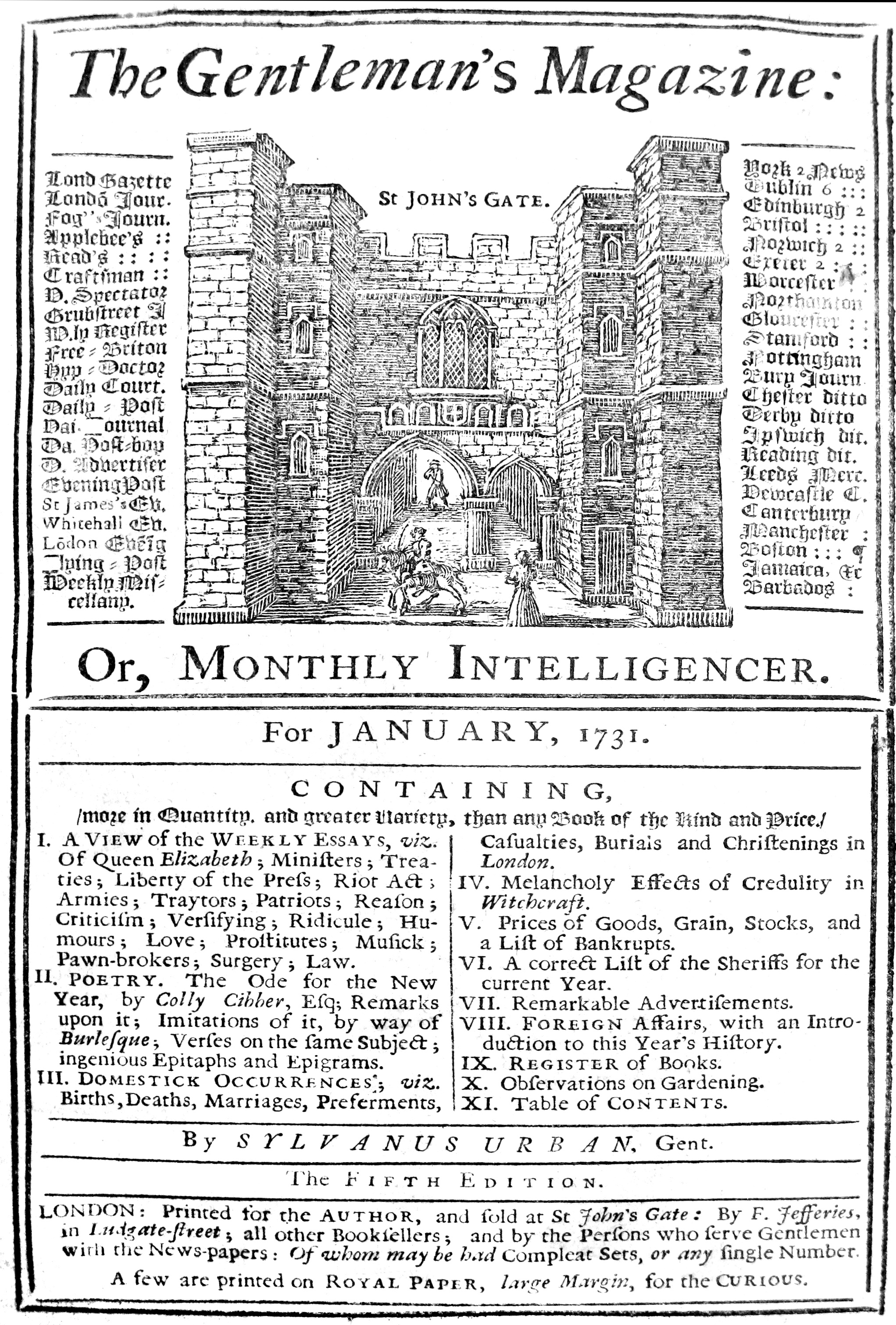
Front page of The Gentleman's Magazine, January 1731

Many women played an essential part in the French Enlightenment because of the role they played as salonnières in Parisian salons, as the contrast to the male philosophes. The salon was the principal social institution of the republic and "became the civil working spaces of the project of Enlightenment". Women, as salonnières, were "the legitimate governors of [the] potentially unruly discourse" that took place within. While women were marginalized in the public culture of the Old Regime, the French Revolution destroyed the old cultural and economic restraints of patronage and corporatism (medieval guilds), opening French society to female participation, particularly in the literary sphere.

In France, the established men of letters (gens de lettres) had fused with the elites (les grands) of French society by the mid-18th century. This led to the creation of an oppositional literary sphere, Grub Street, the domain of a "multitude of versifiers and would-be authors". These men came to London to become authors only to discover that the literary market could not support large numbers of writers, who in any case were very poorly remunerated by the publishing-bookselling guilds.

The writers of Grub Street, the Grub Street Hacks, were left feeling bitter about the relative success of the men of letters and found an outlet for their literature which was typified by the libelle. Written mostly in the form of pamphlets, the libelles "slandered the court, the Church, the aristocracy, the academies, the salons, everything elevated and respectable, including the monarchy itself". Le Gazetier cuirassé by Charles Théveneau de Morande was a prototype of the genre. It was Grub Street literature that was most read by the public during the Enlightenment. According to Darnton, more importantly the Grub Street hacks inherited the "revolutionary spirit" once displayed by the philosophes and paved the way for the French Revolution by desacralizing figures of political, moral, and religious authority in France.

=== Book industry ===
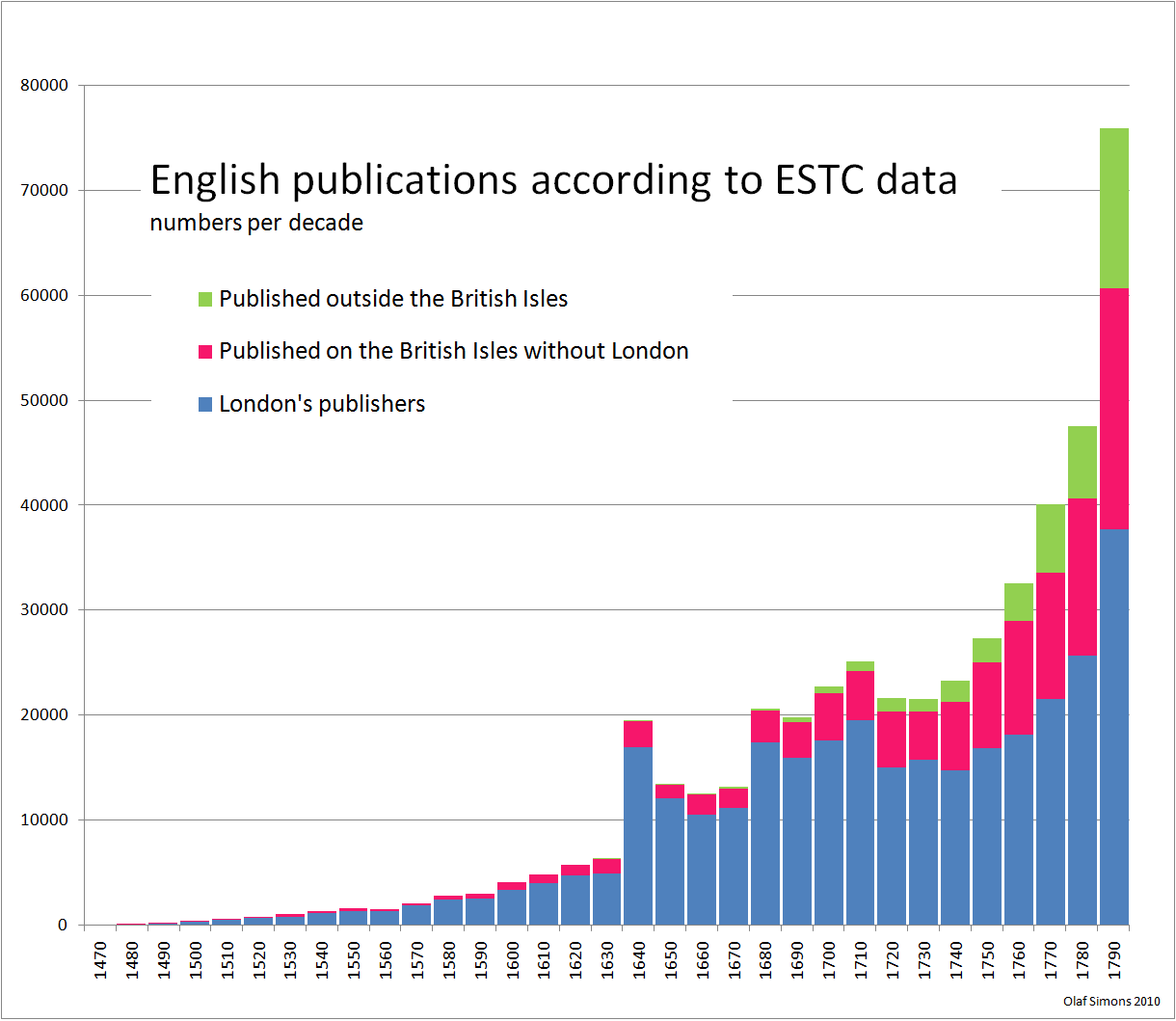
ESTC data 1477–1799 by decade given with a regional differentiation

The increased consumption of reading materials of all sorts was one of the key features of the "social" Enlightenment. Developments in the Industrial Revolution allowed consumer goods to be produced in greater quantities at lower prices, encouraging the spread of books, pamphlets, newspapers, and journals – "media of the transmission of ideas and attitudes". Commercial development likewise increased the demand for information, along with rising populations and increased urbanisation. However, demand for reading material extended outside of the realm of the commercial and outside the realm of the upper and middle classes, as evidenced by the bibliothèque bleue (lit. 'blue library'). Literacy rates are difficult to gauge, but in France the rates doubled over the course of the 18th century. Reflecting the decreasing influence of religion, the number of books about science and art published in Paris doubled from 1720 to 1780, while the number of books about religion dropped to just one-tenth of the total.

Reading underwent serious changes in the 18th century. In particular, Rolf Engelsing has argued for the existence of a reading revolution. Until 1750, reading was done intensively: people tended to own a small number of books and read them repeatedly, often to small audience. After 1750, people began to read "extensively", finding as many books as they could, increasingly reading them alone. This is supported by increasing literacy rates, particularly among women.

The vast majority of the reading public could not afford to own a private library, and while most of the state-run "universal libraries" set up in the 17th and 18th centuries were open to the public, they were not the only sources of reading material. On one end of the spectrum was the bibliothèque bleue (lit. 'blue library'), a collection of cheaply produced books published in Troyes, France. Intended for a largely rural and semi-literate audience these books included almanacs, retellings of medieval romances and condensed versions of popular novels, among other things. While some historians have argued against the Enlightenment's penetration into the lower classes, the bibliothèque bleue represents at least a desire to participate in Enlightenment sociability. Moving up the classes, a variety of institutions offered readers access to material without needing to buy anything. Libraries that lent out their material for a small price started to appear, and occasionally bookstores would offer a small lending library to their patrons. Coffee houses commonly offered books, journals, and sometimes even popular novels to their customers. Tatler and The Spectator, two influential periodicals sold from 1709 to 1714, were closely associated with coffee house culture in London, being both read and produced in various establishments in the city. This is an example of the triple or even quadruple function of the coffee house: reading material was often obtained, read, discussed, and even produced on the premises.

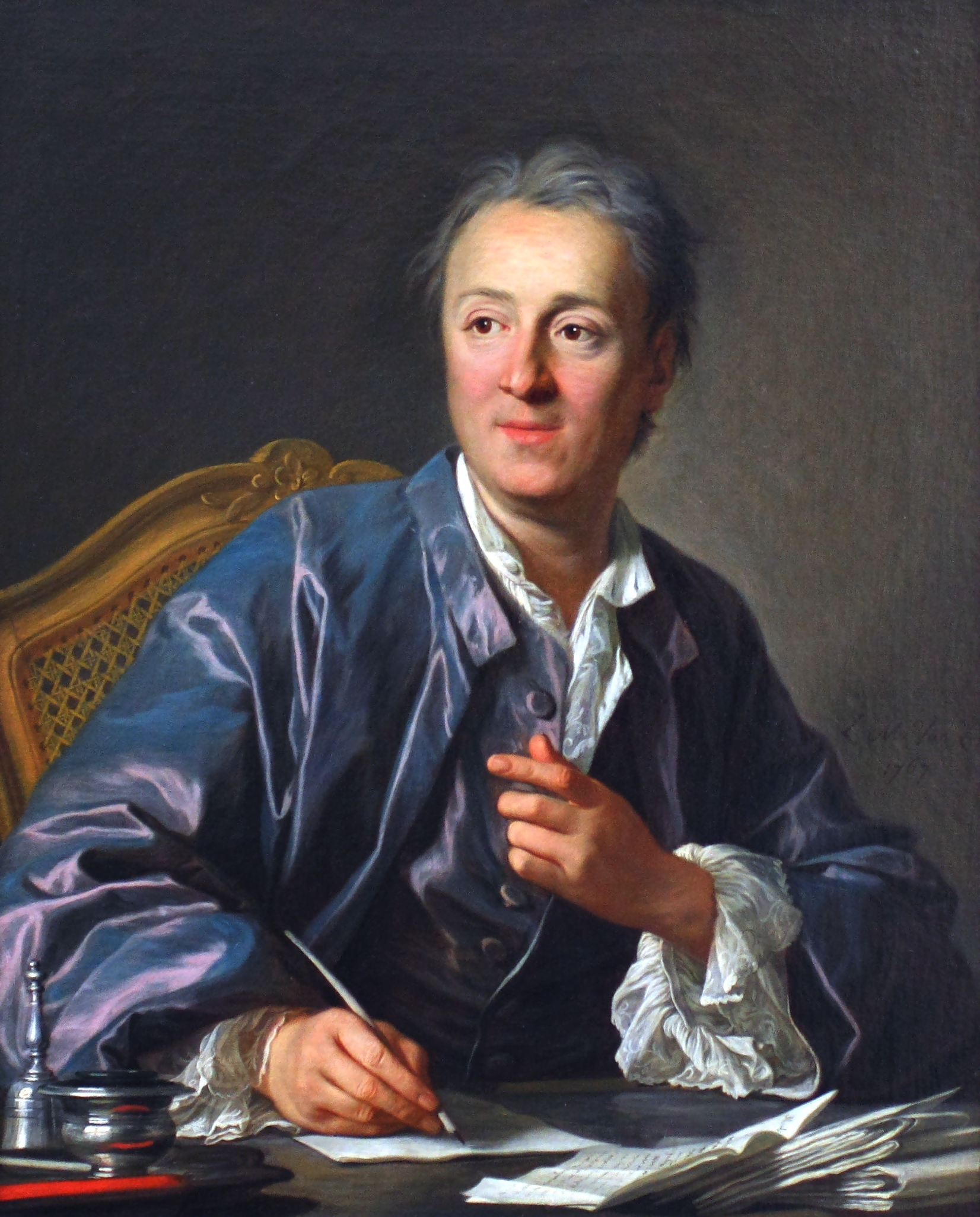
Denis Diderot is best known as the editor of the Encyclopédie.

It is difficult to determine what people actually read during the Enlightenment. For example, examining the catalogs of private libraries gives an image skewed in favor of the classes wealthy enough to afford libraries and also ignores censored works unlikely to be publicly acknowledged. For this reason, a study of publishing would be much more fruitful for discerning reading habits. Across continental Europe, but in France especially, booksellers and publishers had to negotiate censorship laws of varying strictness. For example, the Encyclopédie narrowly escaped seizure and had to be saved by Malesherbes, the man in charge of the French censor. Indeed, many publishing companies were conveniently located outside France so as to avoid overzealous French censors. They would smuggle their merchandise across the border, where it would then be transported to clandestine booksellers or small-time peddlers. The records of clandestine booksellers may give a better representation of what literate Frenchmen might have truly read, since their clandestine nature provided a less restrictive product choice. In one case, political books were the most popular category, primarily libels and pamphlets. Readers were more interested in sensationalist stories about criminals and political corruption than they were in political theory itself. The second most popular category, "general works" (those books "that did not have a dominant motif and that contained something to offend almost everyone in authority"), demonstrated a high demand for generally low-brow subversive literature. However, these works never became part of literary canon and are largely forgotten today as a result.

A healthy, legal publishing industry existed throughout Europe, although established publishers and book sellers occasionally ran afoul of the law. For example, the Encyclopédie, condemned by both the King and Pope Clement XII, nevertheless found its way into print with the help of the aforementioned Malesherbes and creative use of French censorship law. However, many works were sold without running into any legal trouble at all. Borrowing records from libraries in England, Germany, and North America indicate that more than 70% of books borrowed were novels. Less than 1% of the books were of a religious nature, indicating the general trend of declining religiosity.

=== Natural history ===
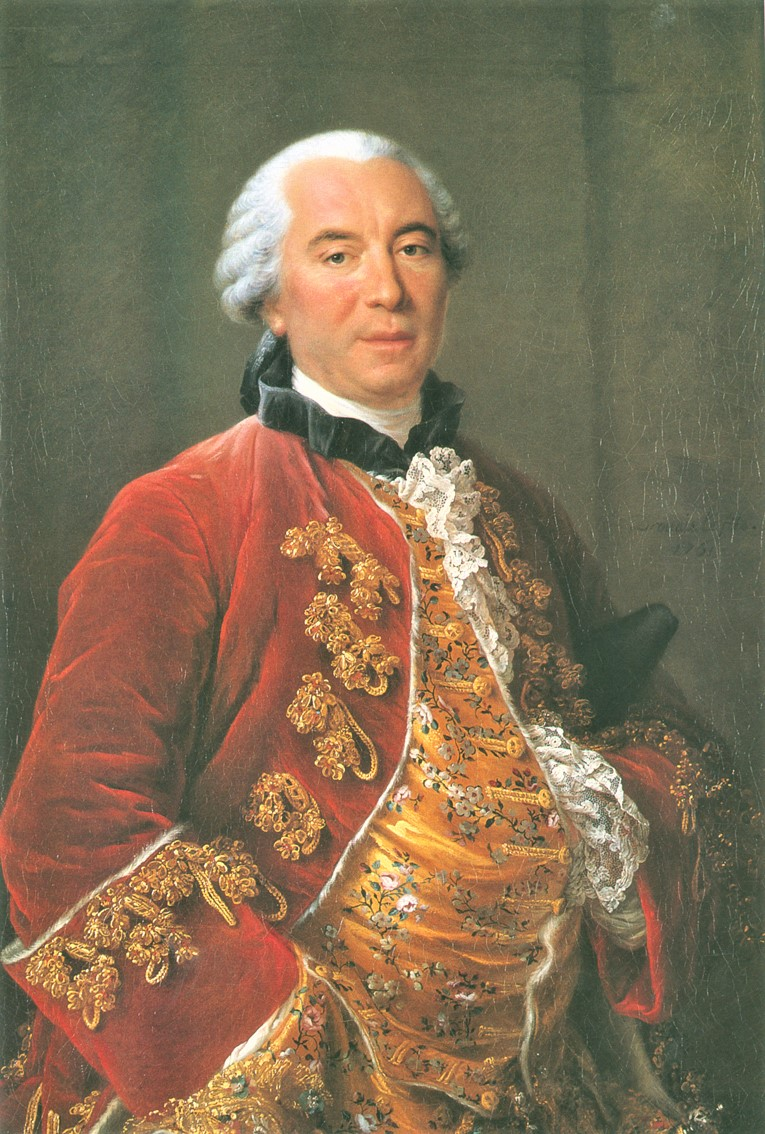
Georges Buffon is best remembered for his Histoire naturelle, a 44 volume encyclopedia describing everything known about the natural world.

A genre that greatly rose in importance was that of scientific literature. Natural history in particular became increasingly popular among the upper classes. Works of natural history include René-Antoine Ferchault de Réaumur's Histoire naturelle des insectes and Jacques Gautier d'Agoty's La Myologie complète, ou description de tous les muscles du corps humain [The Complete Myology, or Description of all the muscles of the human body] (1746). Outside Ancien Régime France, natural history was an important part of medicine and industry, encompassing the fields of botany, zoology, meteorology, hydrology, and mineralogy. Students in Enlightenment universities and academies were taught these subjects to prepare them for careers as diverse as medicine and theology. As shown by Matthew Daniel Eddy, natural history in this context was a very middle class pursuit and operated as a fertile trading zone for the interdisciplinary exchange of diverse scientific ideas.

The target audience of natural history was the French upper class, evidenced more by the specific discourse of the genre than by the generally high prices of its works. Naturalists catered to upper class desire for erudition: many texts had an explicit instructive purpose. However, natural history was often a political affair. As Emma Spary writes, the classifications used by naturalists "slipped between the natural world and the social ... to establish not only the expertise of the naturalists over the natural, but also the dominance of the natural over the social." The idea of taste (le goût) was a social indicator: to truly be able to categorize nature, one had to have the proper taste, an ability of discretion shared by all members of the upper class. In this way, natural history spread many of the scientific developments of the time but also provided a new source of legitimacy for the dominant class. From this basis, naturalists could then develop their own social ideals based on their scientific works.

=== Scientific and literary journals ===
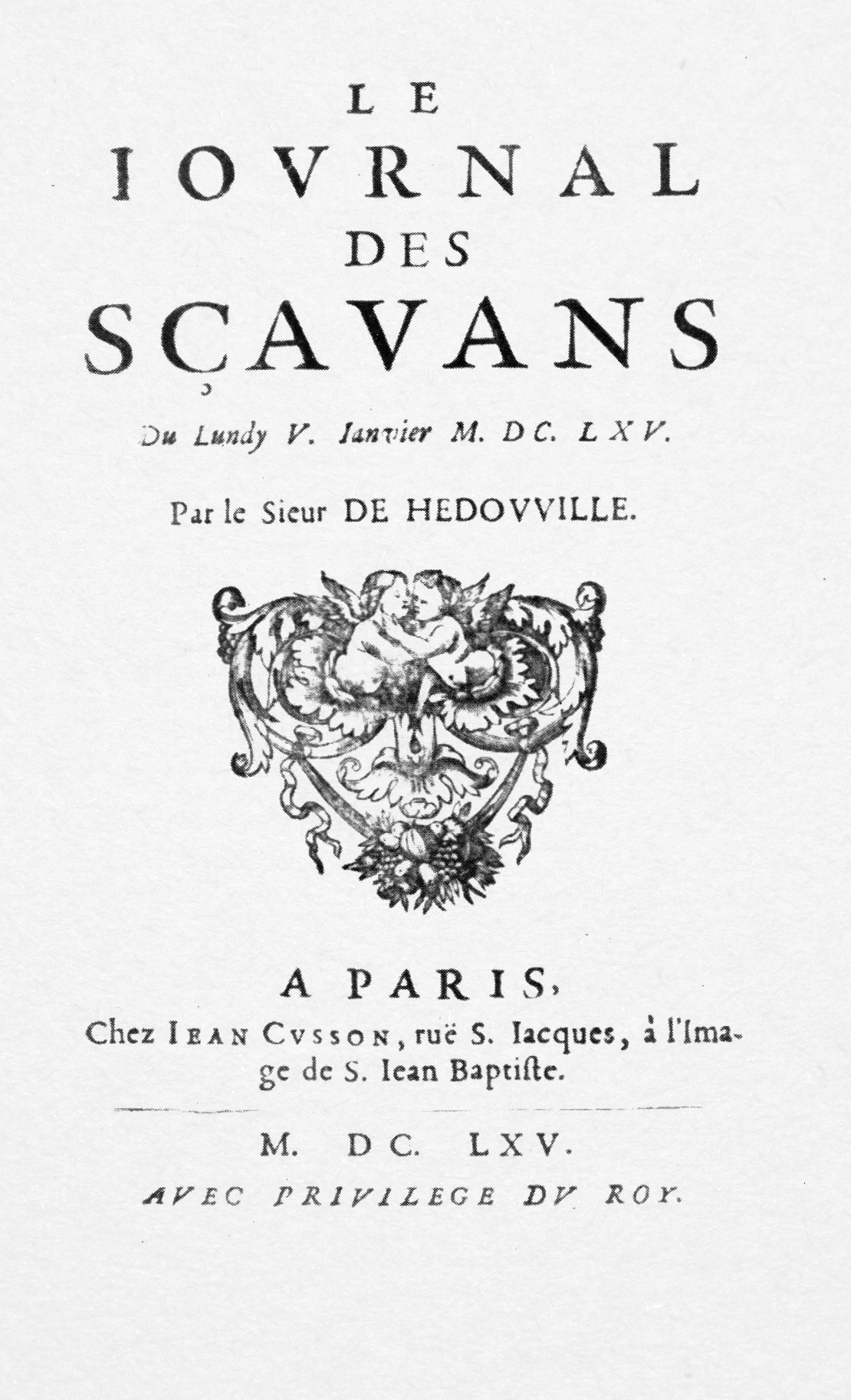
Journal des sçavans was the earliest academic journal published in Europe.

The first scientific and literary journals were established during the Enlightenment. The first journal, the Parisian Journal des sçavans, appeared in 1665. However, it was not until 1682 that periodicals began to be more widely produced. French and Latin were the dominant languages of publication, but there was also a steady demand for material in German and Dutch. There was generally low demand for English publications on the continent, which was echoed by England's similar lack of desire for French works. Languages commanding less of an international market—such as Danish, Spanish, and Portuguese—found journal success more difficult, and a more international language was used instead. French slowly took over Latin's status as the lingua franca of learned circles. This in turn gave precedence to the publishing industry in Holland, where the vast majority of these French language periodicals were produced.

Jonathan Israel called the journals the most influential cultural innovation of European intellectual culture. They shifted the attention of the "cultivated public" away from established authorities to novelty and innovation, and instead promoted the Enlightened ideals of toleration and intellectual objectivity. Being a source of knowledge derived from science and reason, they were an implicit critique of existing notions of universal truth monopolized by monarchies, parliaments, and religious authorities. They also advanced Christian Enlightenment that upheld "the legitimacy of God-ordained authority"—the Bible—in which there had to be agreement between the biblical and natural theories.

=== Encyclopedias and dictionaries ===
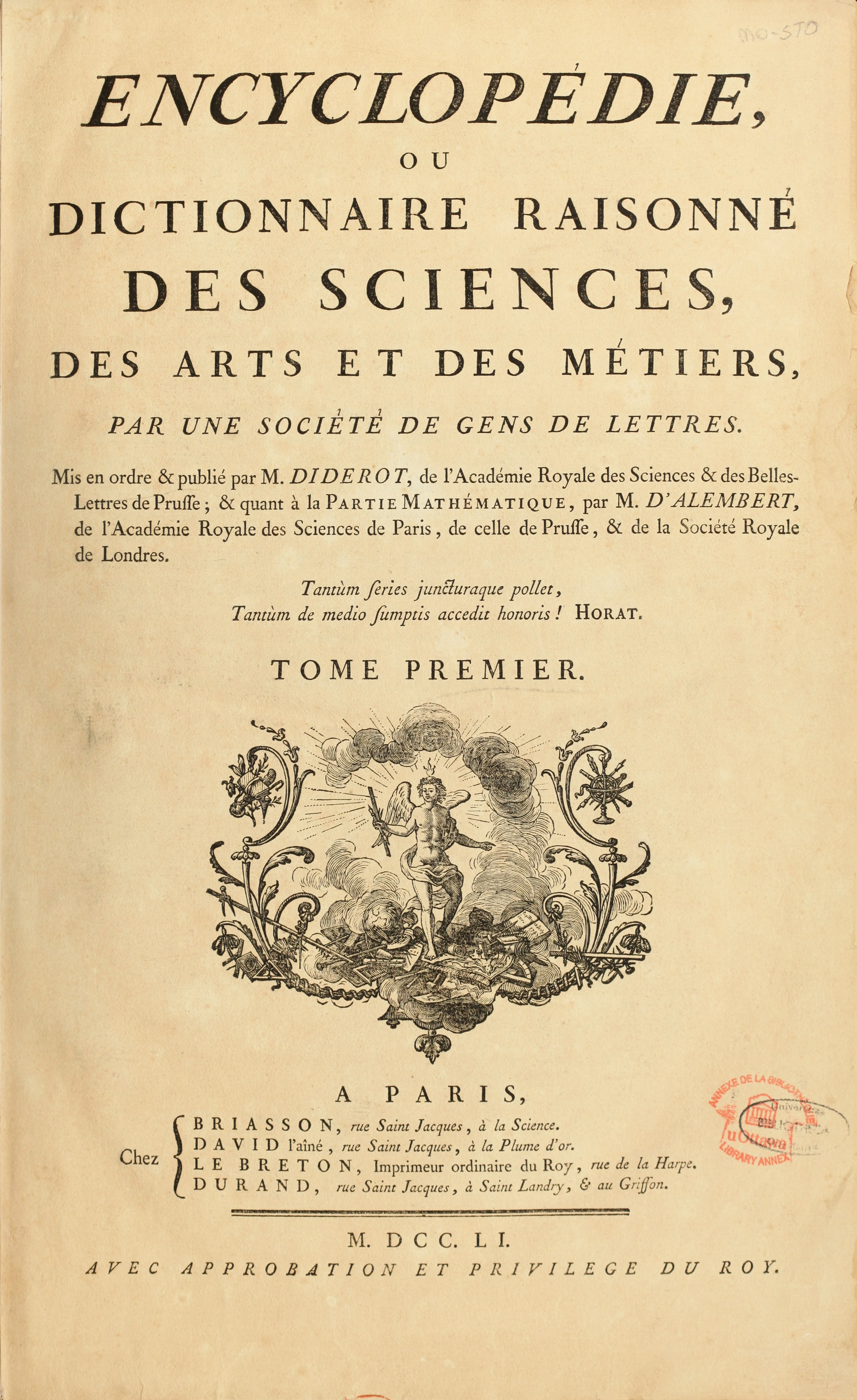
First page of the Encyclopédie, published between 1751 and 1766

Although the existence of dictionaries and encyclopedias spanned into ancient times, the texts changed from defining words in a long running list to far more detailed discussions of those words in 18th-century encyclopedic dictionaries. The works were part of an Enlightenment movement to systematize knowledge and provide education to a wider audience than the elite. As the 18th century progressed, the content of encyclopedias also changed according to readers' tastes. Volumes tended to focus more strongly on secular affairs, particularly science and technology, rather than matters of theology.

Along with secular matters, readers also favoured an alphabetical ordering scheme over cumbersome works arranged along thematic lines. Commenting on alphabetization, the historian Charles Porset has said that "as the zero degree of taxonomy, alphabetical order authorizes all reading strategies; in this respect it could be considered an emblem of the Enlightenment." For Porset, the avoidance of thematic and hierarchical systems thus allows free interpretation of the works and becomes an example of egalitarianism. Encyclopedias and dictionaries also became more popular during the Enlightenment as the number of educated consumers who could afford such texts began to multiply. In the latter half of the 18th century, the number of dictionaries and encyclopedias published by decade increased from 63 between 1760 and 1769 to approximately 148 in the decade proceeding the French Revolution. Along with growth in numbers, dictionaries and encyclopedias also grew in length, often having multiple print runs that sometimes included in supplemented editions.

The first technical dictionary was drafted by John Harris and entitled Lexicon Technicum: Or, An Universal English Dictionary of Arts and Sciences. Harris' book avoids theological and biographical entries and instead concentrates on science and technology. Published in 1704, the Lexicon Technicum was the first book to be written in English that took a methodical approach to describing mathematics and commercial arithmetic along with the physical sciences and navigation. Other technical dictionaries followed Harris' model, including Ephraim Chambers' Cyclopaedia (1728), which included five editions and is a substantially larger work than Harris'. The folio edition of the work even included foldout engravings. The Cyclopaedia emphasized Newtonian theories and Lockean philosophy and contained thorough examinations of technologies such as engraving, brewing, and dyeing.

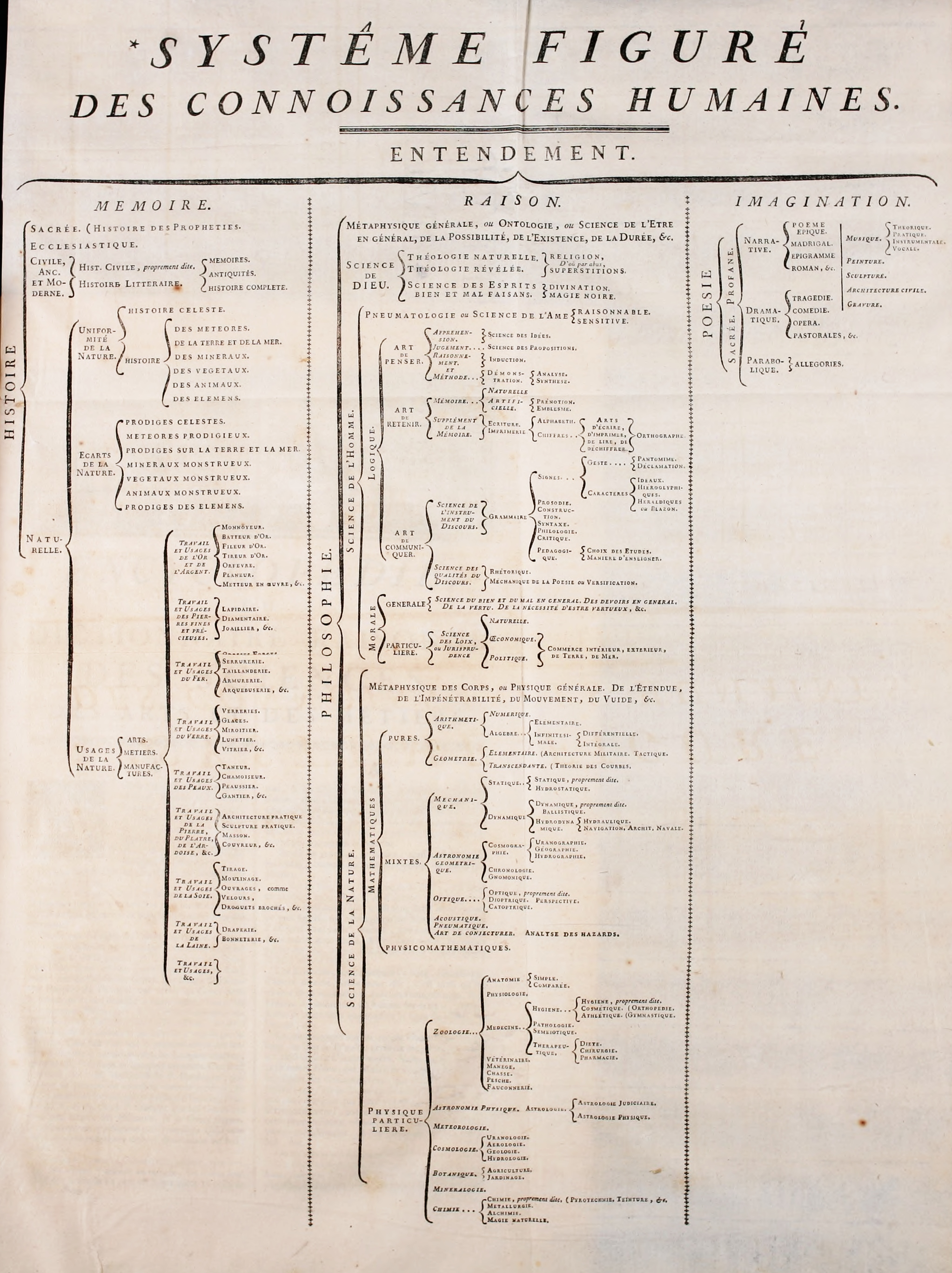
"Figurative system of human knowledge", the structure that the Encyclopédie organised knowledge into. It had three main branches: memory, reason, and imagination.

In Germany, practical reference works intended for the uneducated majority became popular in the 18th century. The Marperger Curieuses Natur-, Kunst-, Berg-, Gewerk- und Handlungs-Lexicon (Marperger Curious Nature, Art, Mountain [i.e. mining], Craft and Trade Lexicon) (1712) explained terms that usefully described the trades and scientific and commercial education. Jablonksi Allgemeines Lexicon (Jablonski General Lexicon) (1721) was better known than the Handlungs-Lexicon and underscored technical subjects rather than scientific theory. For example, over five columns of text were dedicated to wine while geometry and logic were allocated only twenty-two and seventeen lines, respectively. The first edition of the Encyclopædia Britannica (1771) was modelled along the same lines as the German lexicons.

However, the prime example of reference works that systematized scientific knowledge in the Enlightenment were universal encyclopedias rather than technical dictionaries. It was the goal of universal encyclopedias to record all human knowledge in a comprehensive reference work. The most well-known of these works is Diderot and d'Alembert's Encyclopédie, ou dictionnaire raisonné des sciences, des arts et des métiers (Encyclopedia, or reasoned dictionary of the sciences, arts and trades). The work, which began publication in 1751, was composed of 35 volumes and over 71,000 separate entries. A great number of the entries were dedicated to describing the sciences and crafts in detail and provided intellectuals across Europe with a high-quality survey of human knowledge. In d'Alembert's Preliminary Discourse to the Encyclopedia of Diderot, the work's goal to record the extent of human knowledge in the arts and sciences is outlined:

As an Encyclopédie, it is to set forth as well as possible the order and connection of the parts of human knowledge. As a Reasoned Dictionary of the Sciences, Arts, and Trades, it is to contain the general principles that form the basis of each science and each art, liberal or mechanical, and the most essential facts that make up the body and substance of each.

The massive work was arranged according to a "tree of knowledge". The tree reflected the marked division between the arts and sciences, which was largely a result of the rise of empiricism. Both areas of knowledge were united by philosophy, or the trunk of the tree of knowledge. The Enlightenment's desacrilization of religion was pronounced in the tree's design, particularly where theology accounted for a peripheral branch, with black magic as a close neighbour. As the Encyclopédie gained popularity, it was published in quarto and octavo editions after 1777. The quarto and octavo editions were much less expensive than previous editions, making the Encyclopédie more accessible to the non-elite. Robert Darnton estimates that there were approximately 25,000 copies of the Encyclopédie in circulation throughout France and Europe before the French revolution. The extensive yet affordable encyclopedia came to represent the transmission of Enlightenment and scientific education to an expanding audience.

=== Popularization of science ===
One of the most important developments that the Enlightenment era brought to the discipline of science was its popularization. An increasingly literate population seeking knowledge and education in both the arts and the sciences drove the expansion of print culture and the dissemination of scientific learning. The new literate population was precipitated by a high rise in the availability of food; this enabled many people to rise out of poverty, and instead of paying more for food, they had money for education. Popularization was generally part of an overarching Enlightenment ideal that endeavoured "to make information available to the greatest number of people". As public interest in natural philosophy grew during the 18th century, public lecture courses and the publication of popular texts opened up new roads to money and fame for amateurs and scientists who remained on the periphery of universities and academies. More formal works included explanations of scientific theories for individuals lacking the educational background to comprehend the original scientific text. Newton's celebrated Philosophiae Naturalis Principia Mathematica was published in Latin and remained inaccessible to readers without education in the classics until Enlightenment writers began to translate and analyze the text in the vernacular.

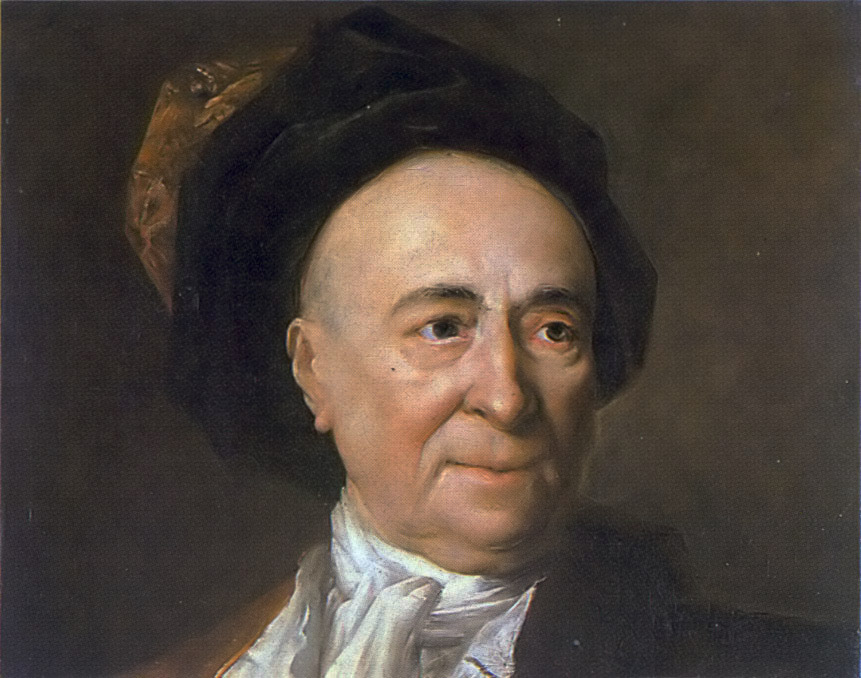
Bernard de Fontenelle

The first significant work that expressed scientific theory and knowledge expressly for the laity, in the vernacular and with the entertainment of readers in mind, was Bernard de Fontenelle's Conversations on the Plurality of Worlds (1686). The book was produced specifically for women with an interest in scientific writing and inspired a variety of similar works. These popular works were written in a discursive style, which was laid out much more clearly for the reader than the complicated articles, treatises, and books published by the academies and scientists. Charles Leadbetter's Astronomy (1727) was advertised as "a Work entirely New" that would include "short and easie [sic] Rules and Astronomical Tables".

The first French introduction to Newtonianism and the Principia was Eléments de la philosophie de Newton, published by Voltaire in 1738. Émilie du Châtelet's translation of the Principia, published after her death in 1756, also helped to spread Newton's theories beyond scientific academies and the university. Writing for a growing female audience, Francesco Algarotti published Il Newtonianism per le dame (Newtonianism for Women), which was a tremendously popular work and was translated from Italian into English by Elizabeth Carter. A similar introduction to Newtonianism for women was produced by Henry Pemberton. His A View of Sir Isaac Newton's Philosophy was published by subscription. Extant records of subscribers show that women from a wide range of social standings purchased the book, indicating the growing number of scientifically inclined female readers among the middling class. During the Enlightenment, women also began producing popular scientific works. Sarah Trimmer wrote a successful natural history textbook for children titled The Easy Introduction to the Knowledge of Nature (1782), which was published for many years in eleven editions.

=== Schools and universities ===
Most work on the Enlightenment emphasizes the ideals discussed by intellectuals, rather than the actual state of education at the time. Leading educational theorists like England's John Locke and Switzerland's Jean Jacques Rousseau both emphasized the importance of shaping young minds early. By the late Enlightenment, there was a rising demand for a more universal approach to education, particularly after the American Revolution and the French Revolution.

The predominant educational psychology from the 1750s onward, especially in northern European countries, was associationism: the notion that the mind associates or dissociates ideas through repeated routines. In addition to being conducive to Enlightenment ideologies of liberty, self-determination, and personal responsibility, it offered a practical theory of the mind that allowed teachers to transform longstanding forms of print and manuscript culture into effective graphic tools of learning for the lower and middle orders of society. Children were taught to memorize facts through oral and graphic methods that originated during the Renaissance.

Many of the leading universities associated with Enlightenment progressive principles were located in northern Europe, with the most renowned being the universities of Leiden, Göttingen, Halle, Montpellier, Uppsala, and Edinburgh. These universities, especially Edinburgh, produced professors whose ideas had a significant impact on Britain's North American colonies and later the American republic. Within the natural sciences, Edinburgh's medical school also led the way in chemistry, anatomy, and pharmacology. In other parts of Europe, the universities and schools of France and most of Europe were bastions of traditionalism and were not hospitable to the Enlightenment. In France, the major exception was the medical university at Montpellier.

=== Learned academies ===
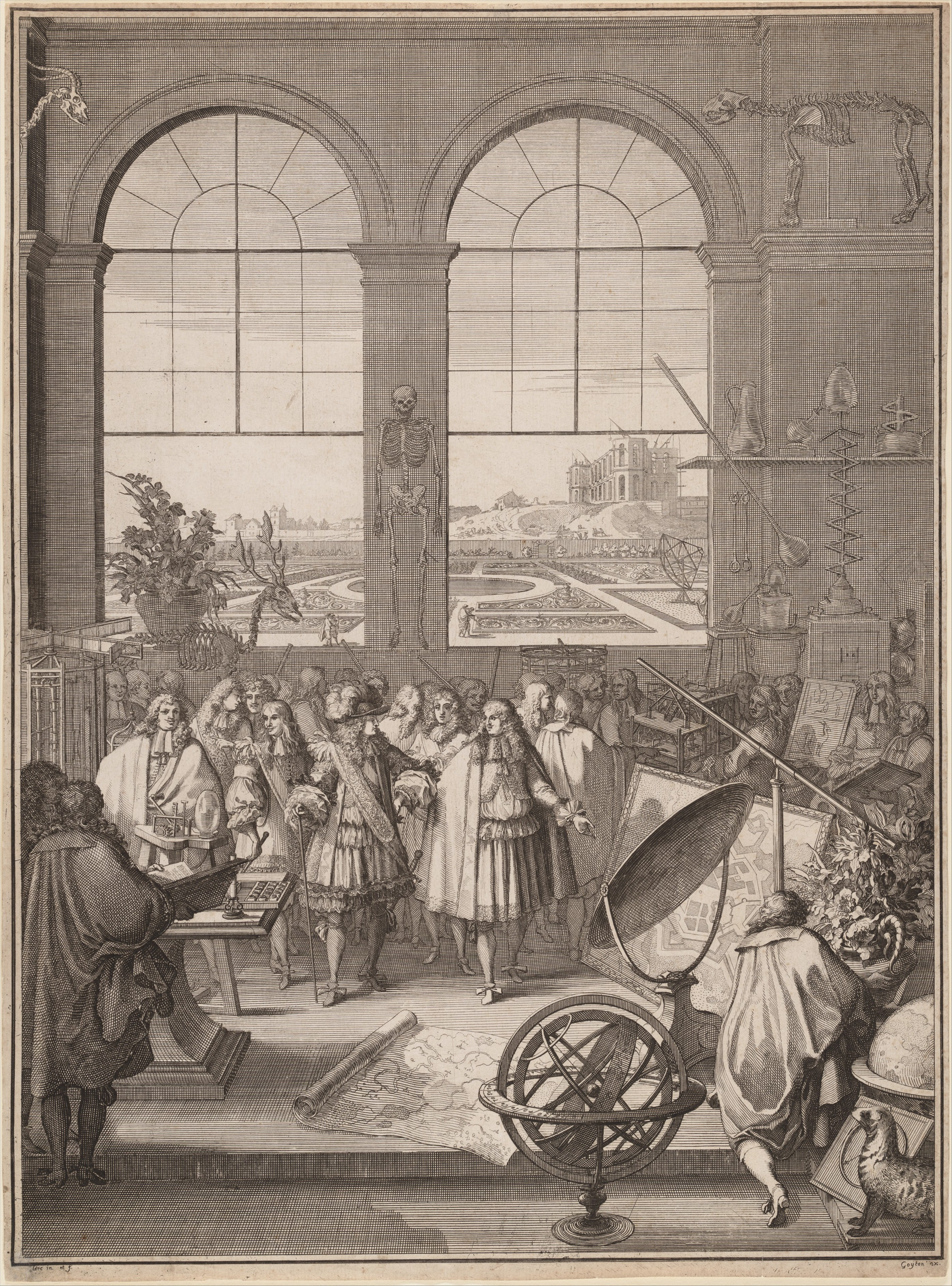
Louis XIV visiting the Academy of Sciences in 1671: "It is widely accepted that 'modern science' arose in the Europe of the 17th century, introducing a new understanding of the natural world"—Peter Barrett

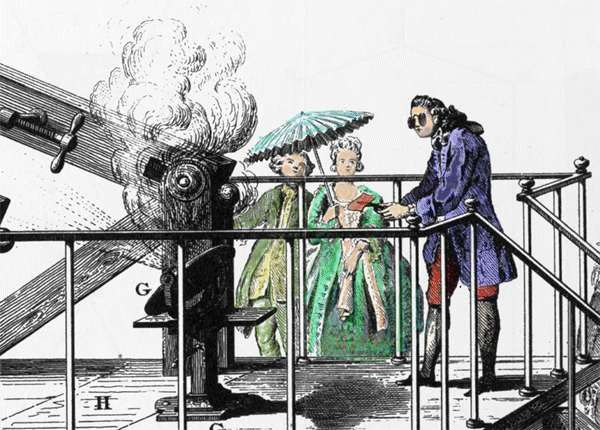
Antoine Lavoisier conducting an experiment related to combustion generated by amplified sun light

The history of Academies in France during the Enlightenment begins with the Academy of Sciences, founded in 1666 in Paris. It was closely tied to the French state, acting as an extension of a government seriously lacking in scientists. It helped promote and organize new disciplines and it trained new scientists. It also contributed to the enhancement of scientists' social status, considering them to be the "most useful of all citizens". Academies demonstrate the rising interest in science along with its increasing secularization, as evidenced by the small number of clerics who were members (13%). The presence of the French academies in the public sphere cannot be attributed to their membership, as although the majority of their members were bourgeois, the exclusive institution was only open to elite Parisian scholars. They perceived themselves as "interpreters of the sciences for the people". For example, it was with this in mind that academicians took it upon themselves to disprove the popular pseudo-science of mesmerism.

The strongest contribution of the French academies to the public sphere comes from the concours académiques (roughly translated as "academic contests") they sponsored throughout France. These academic contests were perhaps the most public of any institution during the Enlightenment. The practice of contests dated back to the Middle Ages and was revived in the mid-17th century. The subject matter had previously been generally religious and/or monarchical, featuring essays, poetry, and painting. However, by roughly 1725 this subject matter had radically expanded and diversified, including "royal propaganda, philosophical battles, and critical ruminations on the social and political institutions of the Old Regime". Topics of public controversy were also discussed such as the theories of Newton and Descartes, the slave trade, women's education, and justice in France. More importantly, the contests were open to all, and the enforced anonymity of each submission guaranteed that neither gender nor social rank would determine the judging. Indeed, although the "vast majority" of participants belonged to the wealthier strata of society ("the liberal arts, the clergy, the judiciary and the medical profession"), there were some cases of the popular classes submitting essays and even winning. Similarly, a significant number of women participated in—and won—the competitions. Of a total of 2,300 prize competitions offered in France, women won 49—perhaps a small number by modern standards but very significant in an age in which very few women had any academic training. Indeed, the majority of the winning entries were for poetry competitions, a genre commonly stressed in women's education.

In England, the Royal Society of London played a significant role in the public sphere and the spread of Enlightenment ideas. It was founded by a group of independent scientists and given a royal charter in 1662. The society played a large role in spreading Robert Boyle's experimental philosophy around Europe and acted as a clearinghouse for intellectual correspondence and exchange. Boyle was "a founder of the experimental world in which scientists now live and operate" and his method based knowledge on experimentation, which had to be witnessed to provide proper empirical legitimacy. This is where the Royal Society came into play: witnessing had to be a "collective act" and the Royal Society's assembly rooms were ideal locations for relatively public demonstrations. However, not just any witness was considered to be credible: "Oxford professors were accounted more reliable witnesses than Oxfordshire peasants." Two factors were taken into account: a witness's knowledge in the area and a witness's "moral constitution". In other words, only members of civil society were considered for Boyle's public.

=== Salons ===
Salons were places where philosophes were reunited and discussed old, current, or new ideas. This led to salons being the birthplace of intellectual and enlightened ideas.

=== Coffeehouses ===
Coffeehouses were especially important to the spread of knowledge during the Enlightenment because they created a unique environment in which people from many different walks of life gathered and shared ideas. They were frequently criticized by nobles who feared the possibility of an environment in which class and its accompanying titles and privileges were disregarded. Such an environment was especially intimidating to monarchs who derived much of their power from the disparity between classes of people. If the different classes joined together under the influence of Enlightenment thinking, they might recognize the all-encompassing oppression and abuses of their monarchs and because of the numbers of their members might be able to successfully revolt. Monarchs also resented the idea of their subjects convening as one to discuss political matters, especially matters of foreign affairs. Rulers thought political affairs were their business only, a result of their divine right to rule.

Coffeehouses became homes away from home for many who sought to engage in discourse with their neighbors and discuss intriguing and thought-provoking matters, from philosophy to politics. Coffeehouses were essential to the Enlightenment, for they were centers of free-thinking and self-discovery. Although many coffeehouse patrons were scholars, many were not. Coffeehouses attracted a diverse set of people, including the educated wealthy and bourgeois as well as the lower classes. Patrons, being doctors, lawyers, merchants, represented almost all classes, so the coffeeshop environment sparked fear in those who wanted to preserve class distinction. One of the most popular critiques of the coffeehouse said that it "allowed promiscuous association among people from different rungs of the social ladder, from the artisan to the aristocrat" and was therefore compared to Noah's Ark, receiving all types of animals, clean and unclean. This unique culture served as a catalyst for journalism, when Joseph Addison and Richard Steele recognized its potential as an audience. Together, Steele and Addison published The Spectator, a daily publication which aimed, through fictional narrator Mr. Spectator, to both entertain and provoke discussion on serious philosophical matters.

The first English coffeehouse opened in Oxford in 1650. Brian Cowan said that Oxford coffeehouses developed into "penny universities", offering a locus of learning that was less formal than at structured institutions. These penny universities occupied a significant position in Oxford academic life, as they were frequented by those consequently referred to as the virtuosi, who conducted their research on some of the premises. According to Cowan, "the coffeehouse was a place for like-minded scholars to congregate, to read, as well as learn from and to debate with each other, but was emphatically not a university institution, and the discourse there was of a far different order than any university tutorial."

The Café Procope was established in Paris in 1686, and by the 1720s there were around 400 cafés in the city. The Café Procope in particular became a center of Enlightenment, welcoming such celebrities as Voltaire and Rousseau. The Café Procope was where Diderot and D'Alembert decided to create the Encyclopédie. The cafés were one of the various "nerve centers" for bruits publics, public noise or rumour. These bruits were allegedly a much better source of information than were the actual newspapers available at the time.

=== Debating societies ===
The debating societies are an example of the public sphere during the Enlightenment. Their origins include:

- Clubs of fifty or more men who, at the beginning of the 18th century, met in pubs to discuss religious issues and affairs of state.
- Mooting clubs, set up by law students to practice rhetoric.
- Spouting clubs, established to help actors train for theatrical roles.
- John Henley's Oratory, which mixed outrageous sermons with even more absurd questions, like "Whether Scotland be anywhere in the world?"

In the late 1770s, popular debating societies began to move into more "genteel" rooms, a change which helped establish a new standard of sociability. The backdrop to these developments was "an explosion of interest in the theory and practice of public elocution" The debating societies were commercial enterprises that responded to this demand, sometimes very successfully. Some societies welcomed from 800 to 1,200 spectators per night.

The debating societies discussed an extremely wide range of topics. Before the Enlightenment, most intellectual debates revolved around "confessional"—that is, Catholic, Lutheran, Reformed (Calvinist) or Anglican—issues, debated primarily to establish which bloc of faith ought to have the "monopoly of truth and a God-given title to authority". After the Enlightenment, everything that previously had been rooted in tradition was questioned, and often replaced by new concepts. After the second half of the 17th century and during the 18th century, a "general process of rationalization and secularization set in" and confessional disputes were reduced to a secondary status in favor of the "escalating contest between faith and incredulity".

In addition to debates on religion, societies discussed issues such as politics and the role of women. However, the critical subject matter of these debates did not necessarily translate into opposition to the government; the results of the debate quite frequently upheld the status quo. From a historical standpoint, one of the most important features of the debating societies was their openness to the public, as women attended and even participated in almost every debating society, which were likewise open to all classes providing they could pay the entrance fee. Once inside, spectators were able to participate in a largely egalitarian form of sociability that helped spread Enlightenment ideas.

=== Masonic lodges ===
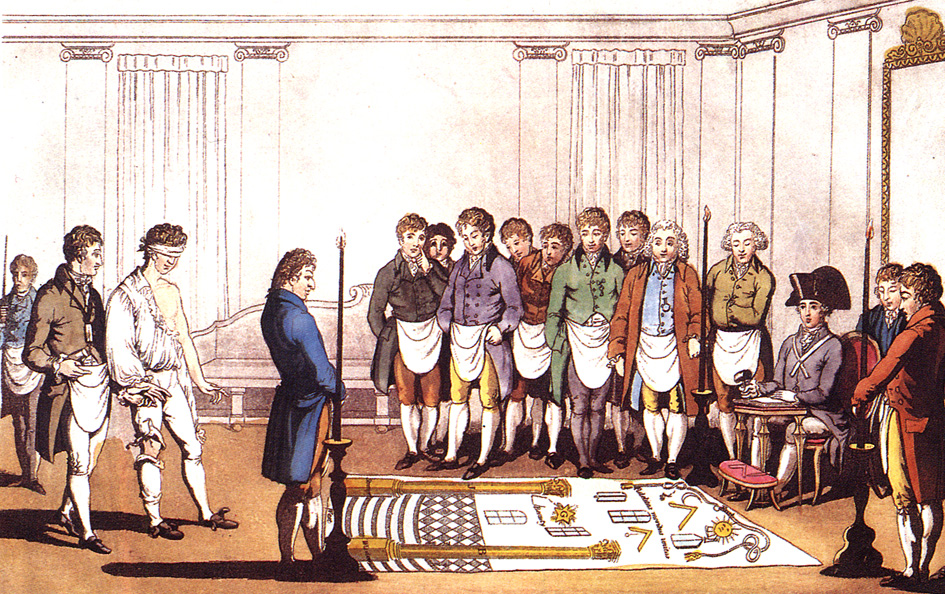
Masonic initiation ceremony

Historians have debated the extent to which the secret network of Freemasonry was a main factor in the Enlightenment. Leaders of the Enlightenment included Freemasons such as Diderot, Montesquieu, Voltaire, Lessing, Pope, Horace Walpole, Robert Walpole, Mozart, Goethe, Frederick the Great, Benjamin Franklin, and George Washington. Norman Davies said Freemasonry was a powerful force on behalf of liberalism in Europe from about 1700 to the twentieth century. It expanded during the Enlightenment, reaching practically every country in Europe. It was especially attractive to powerful aristocrats and politicians as well as intellectuals, artists, and political activists.

During the Enlightenment, Freemasons comprised an international network of like-minded men, often meeting in secret in ritualistic programs at their lodges. They promoted the ideals of the Enlightenment and helped diffuse these values across Britain, France, and other places. Freemasonry as a systematic creed with its own myths, values, and rituals originated in Scotland c. 1600 and spread to England and then across the Continent in the 18th century. They fostered new codes of conduct—including a communal understanding of liberty and equality inherited from guild sociability—"liberty, fraternity, and equality". Scottish soldiers and Jacobite Scots brought to the Continent ideals of fraternity, which reflected not the local system of Scottish customs, but the institutions and ideals originating in the English Revolution against royal absolutism. Freemasonry was particularly prevalent in France—by 1789, there were perhaps as many as 100,000 French Masons, making Freemasonry the most popular of all Enlightenment associations. The Freemasons displayed a passion for secrecy and created new degrees and ceremonies. Similar societies, partially imitating Freemasonry, emerged in France, Germany, Sweden, and Russia. One example was the Illuminati, founded in Bavaria in 1776, which was copied after the Freemasons, but was never part of the movement. The name itself translates to "enlightened", chosen to reflect their original intent to promote the values of the movement. The Illuminati was an overtly political group, whereas most Masonic lodges decidedly were not.

Masonic lodges created a private model for public affairs. They "reconstituted the polity and established a constitutional form of self-government, complete with constitutions and laws, elections, and representatives". In other words, the micro-society set up within the lodges constituted a normative model for society as a whole. This was especially true on the continent: when the first lodges began to appear in the 1730s, their embodiment of British values was often seen as threatening by state authorities. For example, the Parisian lodge that met in the mid-1720s was composed of English Jacobite exiles. Furthermore, freemasons across Europe explicitly linked themselves to the Enlightenment as a whole. For example, in French lodges the line "As the means to be enlightened I search for the enlightened" was a part of their initiation rites. British lodges assigned themselves the duty to "initiate the unenlightened". This did not necessarily link lodges to the irreligious, but neither did this exclude them from the occasional heresy. In fact, many lodges praised the Grand Architect, the masonic terminology for the deistic divine being who created a scientifically ordered universe.

German historian Reinhart Koselleck claimed: "On the Continent there were two social structures that left a decisive imprint on the Age of Enlightenment: the Republic of Letters and the Masonic lodges." Scottish professor Thomas Munck argues that "although the Masons did promote international and cross-social contacts which were essentially non-religious and broadly in agreement with enlightened values, they can hardly be described as a major radical or reformist network in their own right." Many of the Masons' values seemed to greatly appeal to Enlightenment values and thinkers. Diderot discusses the link between Freemason ideals and the enlightenment in d'Alembert's Dream, exploring masonry as a way of spreading enlightenment beliefs. Historian Margaret Jacob stresses the importance of the Masons in indirectly inspiring enlightened political thought. On the negative side, Daniel Roche contests claims that Masonry promoted egalitarianism and he argues the lodges only attracted men of similar social backgrounds. The presence of noble women in the French "lodges of adoption" that formed in the 1780s was largely due to the close ties shared between these lodges and aristocratic society.

The major opponent of Freemasonry was the Catholic Church, so in countries with a large Catholic element, such as France, Italy, Spain, and Mexico, much of the ferocity of the political battles involve the confrontation between what Davies calls the reactionary Church and enlightened Freemasonry. Even in France, Masons did not act as a group. American historians, while noting that Benjamin Franklin and George Washington were indeed active Masons, have downplayed the importance of Freemasonry in causing the American Revolution because the Masonic order was non-political and included both Patriots and their enemy the Loyalists.

=== Art ===
At the same time, the classical art of Greece and Rome became interesting to people again, since archaeological teams discovered Pompeii and Herculaneum.

== See also ==
- Atlantic Revolutions
- Counter-Enlightenment
- Dark Enlightenment
- Early modern philosophy
- Enlightened absolutism
- European and American voyages of scientific exploration
- Illuminism
- Renaissance philosophy
- Witch trials in the early modern period
