= Henry Lemonnier =

French art historian

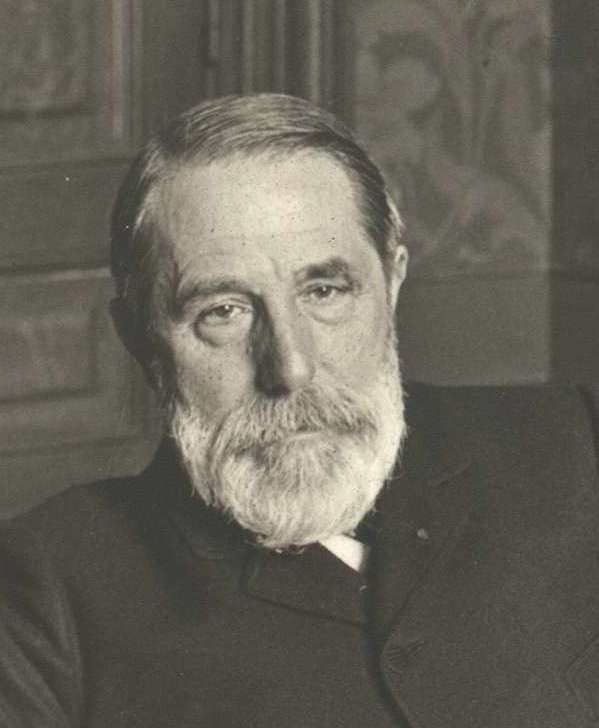
Henry Lemmonier (c. 1900)

Joseph Henri Lemonnier (8 August 1842, Saint-Prix - 17 May 1936, Paris) was a French art historian; the first to hold the chair of art history at the Sorbonne.

== Biography ==
His father was André-Hippolyte Lemonnier, a poet, art collector and Secretary of the Académie de France à Rome. His grandfather, Anicet Charles Gabriel Lemonnier, was a painter of historical subjects.

He was a student at the Lycée Charlemagne, then entered the École Impériale des Chartes, where he became an archivist-paleographer in 1865, with a thesis on Roman administration under the Visigoths. He passed the agrégé in history in 1872. After teaching in several secondary schools, he was placed in charge of the history course at the École des Beaux-Arts in 1874, and at the École normale supérieure de Sèvres in 1881. He was named a Knight in the Legion of Honor in 1888.

In 1889, as a substitute for Ernest Lavisse at the Sorbonne, he followed the model established by Louis Courajod at the École du Louvre; treating art history as an integral part of history in general. This resulted in his being given charge of the art history courses there, in 1893 The first chair of art history in France was created for him in 1899. His first major project involved the creation of an art library, with a collection of prints, photographs, and sculptural casts.

During his time there, he also edited Courajod's courses, participated in writing and editing volume five of the Histoire de France depuis les origines jusqu'à la Révolution by Lavisse, and edited the minutes of the Académie royale d'architecture, dating from 1671 to 1793. Shortly after his retirement from the Sorbonne in 1913, he was elected to the Académie des Beaux-Arts, where he took Seat #2 in the "Unattached" section, succeeding Jules Comte, who had died the previous year.
