= The Orphan of Zhao =

Chinese play attributed to Ji Junxiang

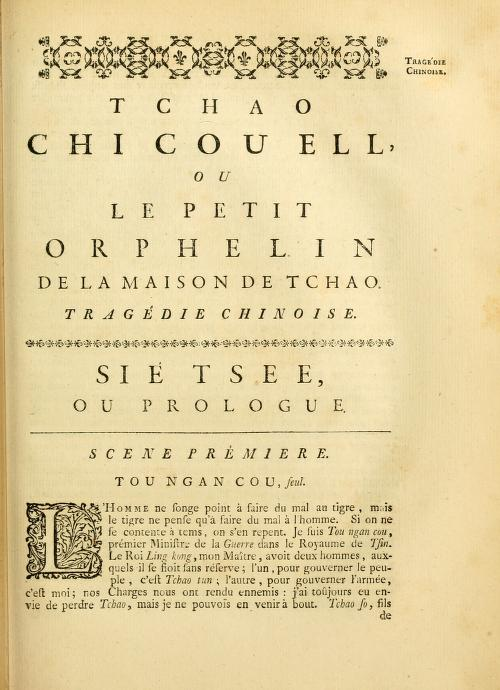
- A page of Prémare's translation in French, published in Du Halde's Description de la Chine
- Original language: Chinese
- Written by: Ji Junxiang
- Characters: General Tu'an Gu; Minister Zhao Dun; General Zhao Shuo; Cheng Ying, the doctor; General Han Jue; Minister Gongsun Chiujiu; Cheng Bo, the orphan; Lady Zhuang
- Genre: Zaju
- Setting: State of Jin during the Spring and Autumn period

Premiere
- Date: 13th century

The Orphan of Zhao
- Traditional Chinese: 趙氏孤兒
- Simplified Chinese: 赵氏孤儿
Transcriptions
Standard Mandarin
- Hanyu Pinyin: Zhàoshì gū'ér

The Great Revenge of the Orphan of Zhao
- Traditional Chinese: 趙氏孤兒大報仇
- Simplified Chinese: 赵氏孤儿大报仇
Transcriptions
Standard Mandarin
- Hanyu Pinyin: Zhàoshì gū'ér dà bàochóu

The Orphan of Zhao (Chinese: 趙氏孤兒) is a Chinese play from the Yuan dynasty, attributed to the 13th-century dramatist Ji Junxiang (紀君祥). The play has as its full name The Great Revenge of the Orphan of Zhao. The play is classified in the zaju genre of dramas. It is divided in six parts, comprising five acts (折 zhe) and a wedge (楔子 xiezi), which may be an interlude or — as it is in this case — a prologue. It contains both dialogue and songs.

The story of The Orphan of Zhao takes place during the Spring and Autumn period and revolves around the central theme of revenge. The protagonists are General Han Jue in the first act, the retired Minister Gongsun Chujiu (公孙杵臼) in the second and third act, and the Zhao orphan in the final two acts. The Orphan of Zhao was the first Chinese play to be known in Europe.

== Background ==
Until Ji Junxiang's play in the 13th century, the story appeared in prose form as historical narrative. After Ji's play, stage drama was the main form, with numerous regional operas, some completely independent of his play.

The Records of the Grand Historian, written by the historian Sima Qian from the Han dynasty, contains a chapter surrounding the events of the Zhao family. These records were adapted by Ji Junxiang in The Orphan of Zhao. The play revolves around the theme of familial revenge, which is placed in the context of Confucian morality and social hierarchical structure. Though the story highlights social values and norms, Shi (2009) says that the many violent scenes mostly serve as theatrical entertainment and secondarily incite moral feelings in the audience. Shi (2009) remarked that Cheng Ying's suffering and endurance, as he was forced to live in his enemy's household so he could protect the orphan, could be interpreted as an ironic reflection by the author about the ethno-political circumstances of the Yuan era. The author incorporated Han institutions of Confucian values through his work.

During the Yuan dynasty, The Great Revenge of the Orphan of Zhao (趙氏孤兒大報仇), also known as The Orphan of Zhao’s Wronged Revenge (趙氏孤兒冤報冤) or simply The Orphan of Zhao, swept across the country and became one of the representative masterpieces of Yuan zaju drama.

== Plot summary ==
=== Prologue ===
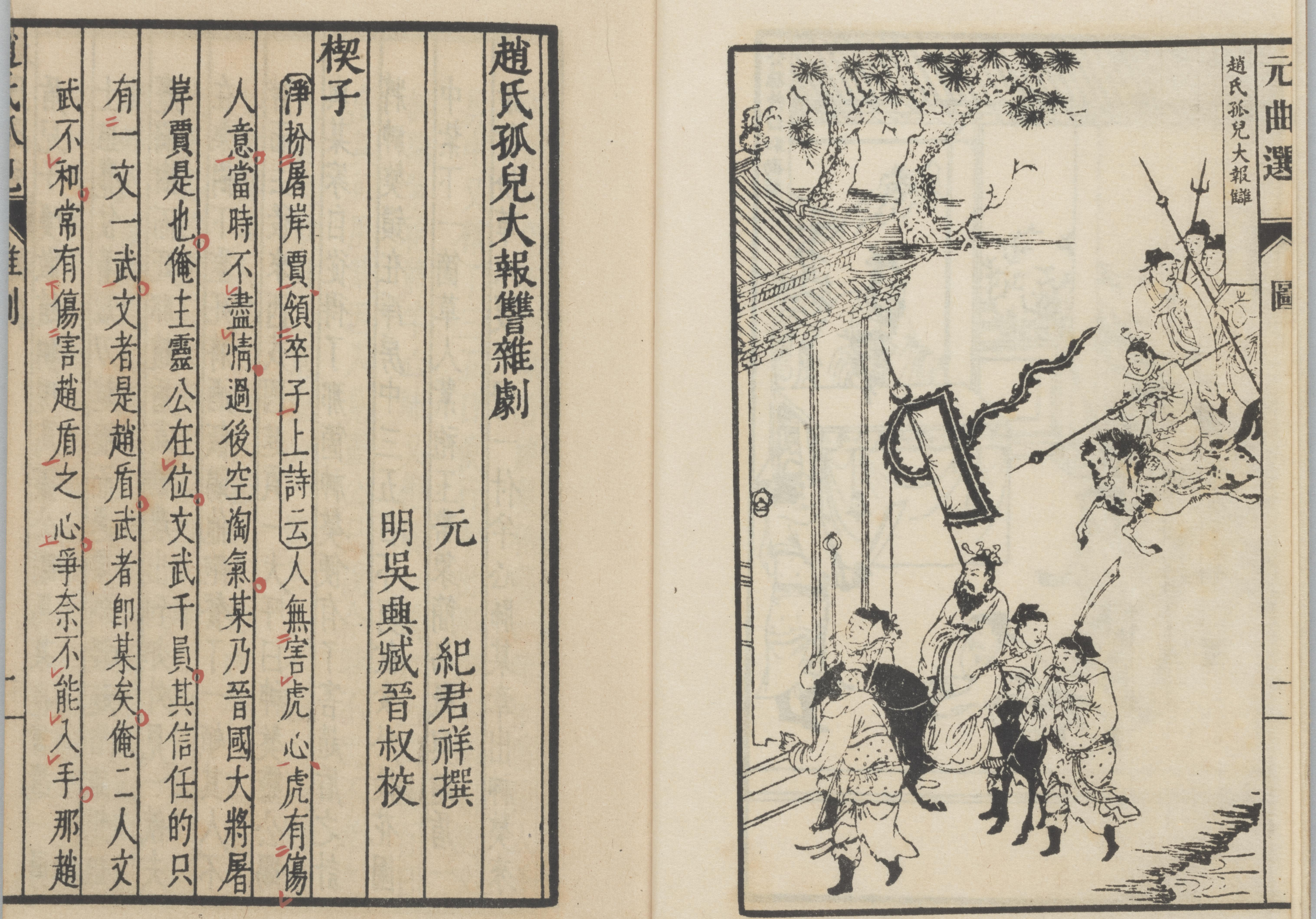
Pages of The Great Revenge of the Orphan of Zhao from the collection Yuanquxua (元曲選)

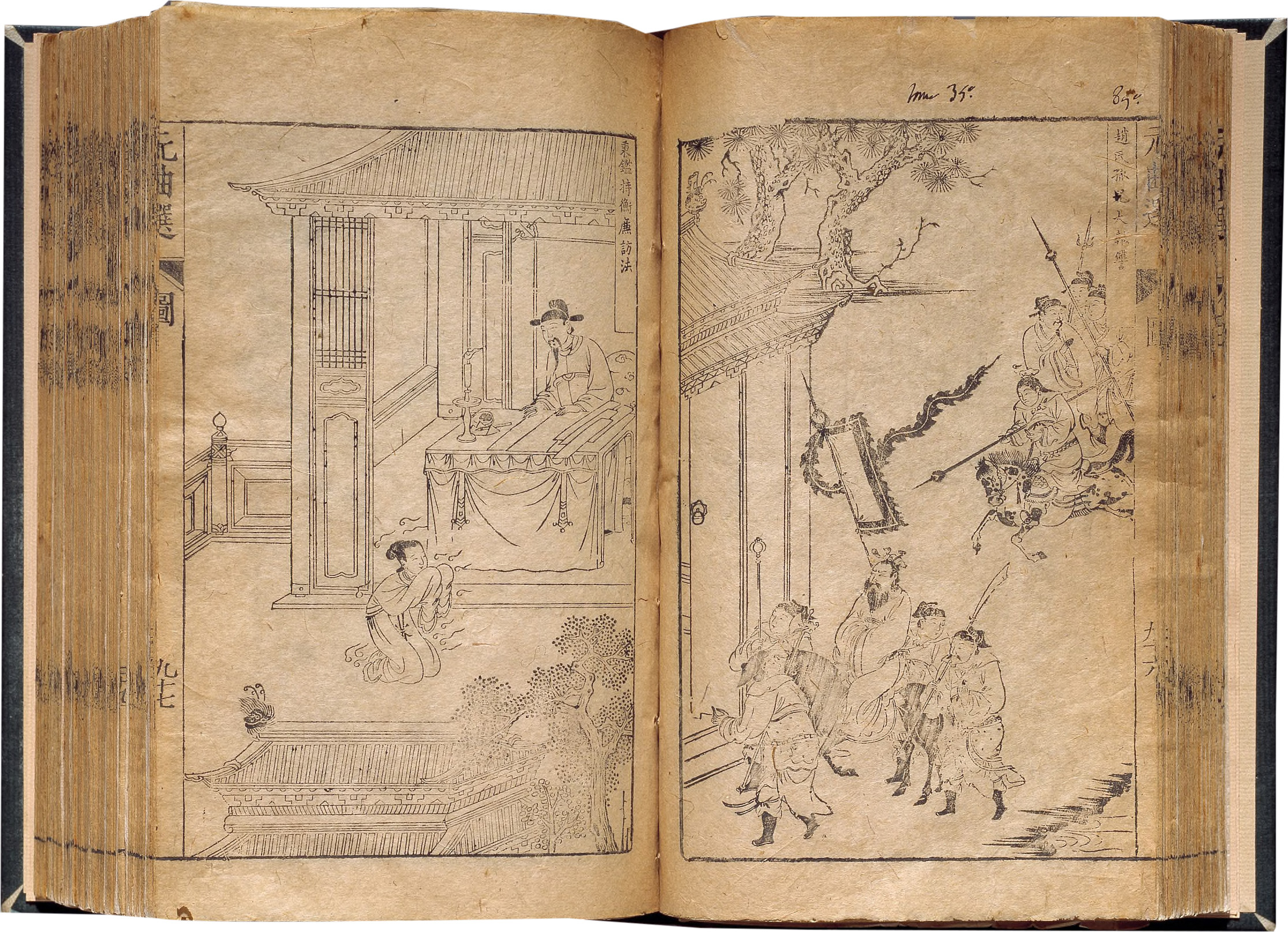
Illustration of The Great Revenge of the Orphan of Zhao (the right illustration) from the collection "Selected One Hundred Plays of the Yuan Dynasty" compiled by Zang Maoxun from the Ming dynasty

Duke Ling was the ruler of the Jin state. In his court, Minister Zhao Dun and General Tu'an Gu were two of his most influential subordinates. However, Tu'an Gu had a deep hatred for Zhao Dun. He wanted to destroy his rival, Zhao Dun, and exterminate the Zhao family. General Tu'an Gu succeeded in framing Zhao Dun, and slaughtered 300 members of the Zhao family. Soon thereafter, a decree was forged in the duke's name to order the death of General Zhao Shuo, the son of Zhao Dun. Zhao Shuo had namely been spared during the massacre as he was married to Lady Zhuang, the daughter of Duke Ling. When General Zhao Shuo received the forged decree, he commits suicide.

=== First act ===
Zhao Shuo and his wife were expecting a child, but the infant was born after the tragic circumstances involving his father's death. Tu'an Gu, intending to get rid of the newborn infant, orders General Han Jue to surround the palace. Lady Zhuang entrusts her newborn child to the physician Cheng Ying, a retainer to the Zhao family. However, she knew—as Cheng Ying had indicated—that she would be pressured to reveal where her child is, thus she took her own life. As the physician Cheng Ying was entrusted to keep the child safe, he attempts to escape with the child hidden in his medicine chest. While Cheng is departing through the palace gates, he is stopped and questioned by Han Jue. Eventually, Han Jue discovered the child, whom Cheng Ying had tried to hide and keep safe. However, troubled by his sense of compassion, he allows Cheng Ying and the infant to escape. Thereafter he commits suicide by taking his sword to his throat, realizing that he will be tortured for what happened to the orphan.

=== Second act ===
After these events, Tu'an Gu threatens to kill every infant in Jin if the Zhao orphan is not produced. Cheng Ying, who was fearful, consults the retired Minister Gongsun Chujiu. To prevent this massacre, Cheng Ying decides to sacrifice his own child in desperation so that the safety of the Zhao orphan and every infant in the state was ensured.

=== Third act ===
Gongsun Chujiu departs with Cheng's child, whom he presented as the Zhao orphan. In the self-sacrifice, both Gongsun and the child were found and murdered. Cheng Ying silently suffers and weeps for his own child before he parts with him.

=== Fourth act ===
Twenty years had passed since the third act. Cheng Ying has taken care of the orphan during his early life. The Zhao orphan, now known as Cheng Bo, has reached maturity. General Tu'an Gu has no child of his own, thus he had adopted the Zhao orphan, unknowingly of his true identity, and named him Tu Cheng. On a fateful day, the orphan is in Cheng Ying's study, where he discovers a scroll depicting all the people involved in the tragic events relating to his early life. Cheng Ying decides the time has come to show the tragedy of the Zhao family and reveal to the orphan the truth of his origins. Various tragic events featuring many loyal friends and retainers, who gave their lives, were depicted on the scroll.

=== Fifth act ===
After discovering the truth, the Zhao orphan kills Tu'an Gu in the streets and avenges his family. The orphan, now known as Zhao Wu, is reinstated with his family titles and properties.

== Translations and adaptations ==
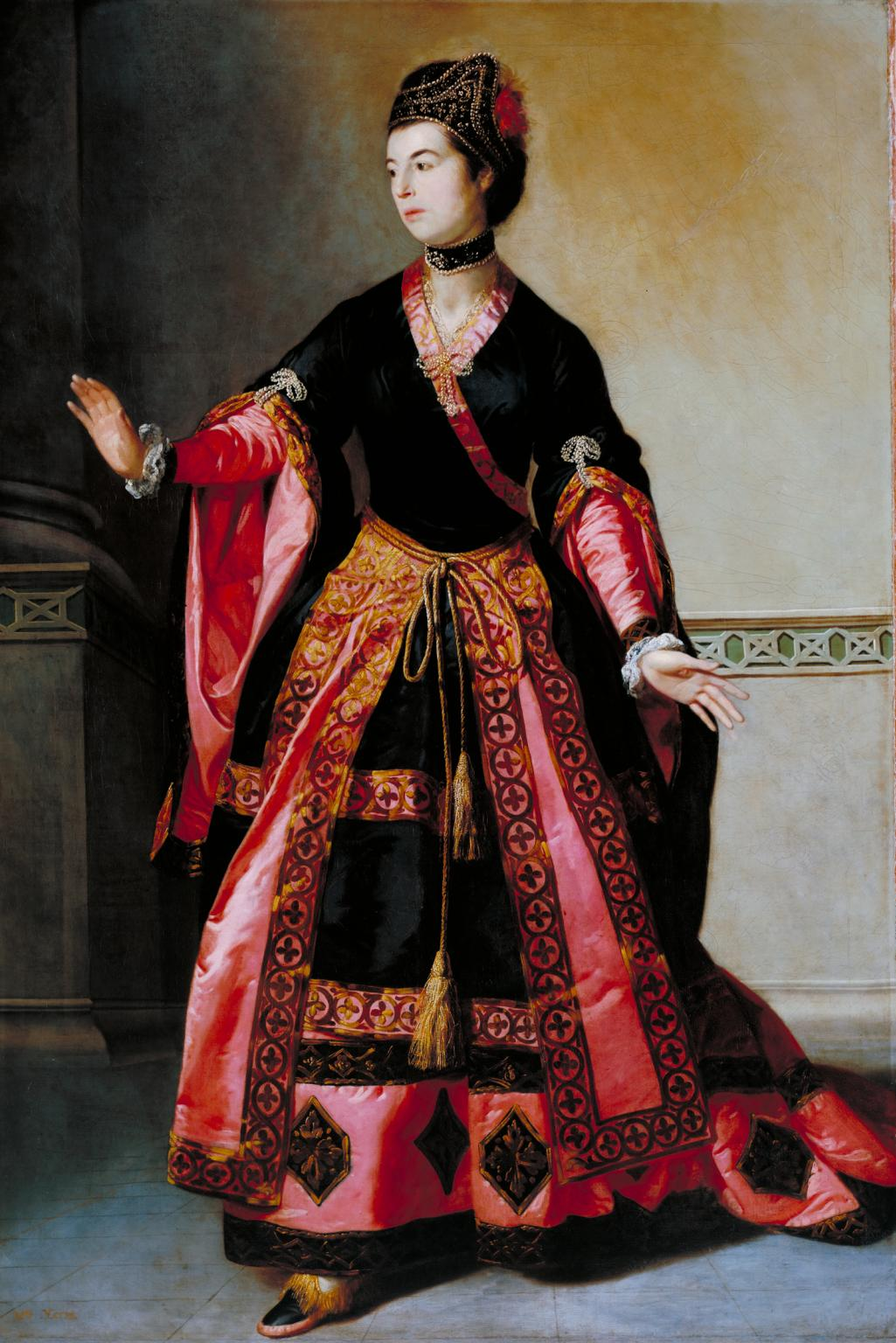
Mary Ann Yates as Mandane by Tilly Kettle, 1765. A portrait of Mary Ann Yates as Mandane in Arthur Murphy's tragedy The Orphan of China

The Orphan of Zhao was the first Chinese play to be translated into any European language. The Jesuit father Joseph Henri Marie de Prémare translated the play, which he titled L'Orphelin de la Maison de Tchao, into French in 1731. He translated the dialogue but not the songs in his work. The story caught the imagination of European minds at a time when chinoiserie was in vogue and this translation was the basis for adaptations over the next few decades.

Premaré sent the translation to be delivered to Étienne Fourmont, a member of the French Academy. However, Jean Baptiste Du Halde took possession of it instead and published it in his Description Géographique, Historique, Chronologique, Politique et Physique de l'Empire de la Chine et de la Tartarie Chinois in 1735, which was done without permission from Prémare or Fourmont. Whatever the circumstances, Du Halde published the first European translation of a genuine Chinese play. Prémare's work was translated into English for two distinct English editions of Du Halde's book, which appeared in 1736 and 1741 respectively. The first one was translated was by Richard Brookes in 1736. The second one was translated by Green and Guthrie in 1738–41. In 1762, a third English translation of Prémare's work was done by Thomas Percy, which was a revision of Green and Guthrie. Many of Prémare's mistranslations and his omission of the songs remained. In his book, Du Halde (1739) remarked: "There are Plays the Songs of which are difficult to be understood, because they are full of Allusions to things unknown to us, and Figures of Speech very difficult for us to observe." The play was well-received throughout Europe with the vogue of chinoiserie at its height. Between 1741 and 1759, it was adapted into French, English, and Italian.

In 1741, William Hatchett wrote and published the earliest adaptation of the Chinese play, which he did in English, titled The Chinese Orphan: An Historical Tragedy. In its essence, his play was written as a political attack on Sir Robert Walpole, who was likened to Tu'an Gu, renamed as Saiko in his play. It was never produced and, in the words of John Genest, "totally unfit for representation." Hatchett made a dedication to the Duke of Argyll in his work, where the play's characters could be recognized as the people whom he satirized:

"As the Chinese are a wise discerning People, and much fam'd for their Art in Government, it is not to be wonder'd at, that the Fable is political: Indeed, it exhibits an amazing Series of Male-administration, which the Chinese Author has wrought up to the highest Pitch of Abhorrence, as if he had been acquainted with the Inflexibility of your Grace's Character in that respect. It's certain, he has exaggerated Nature, and introduced rather a Monster than a Man; but perhaps it is a Maxim with the Chinese Poets to represent Prime Ministers as so many Devils, to deter honest People from being deluded by them."

In Vienna, the Italian playwright Pietro Metastasio received a request from Empress Maria Theresa to write a drama for a court performance. Therefore, in 1752, he produced L'Eroe cinese inspired from the Chinese play, mentioning specifically the story in Du Halde's book. Metastasio's play had a simple plot, because he was restricted by the number of actors (namely five) and duration.

In 1753, Voltaire wrote his adaptation titled L'Orphelin de la Chine. Voltaire's thesis about his play was that the story exemplified morality, in which, as he explained, genius and reason has a natural superiority over blind force and barbarism. He praised the Confucian morality in the Chinese play, remarking that it was a "valuable monument of antiquity, and gives us more insight into the manners of China than all the histories which ever were, or ever will be written of that vast empire". However, he still considered the Chinese play's violation of the unities of time, action, and place as problematic, likening it to some of Shakespeare and Lope de Vega's "monstrous farces" as "nothing but a heap of incredible stories". The story of the orphan is retained in Voltaire's play, but the orphan is placed in the setting of invading Tartars. The orphan, who was the royal heir, is entrusted to the official Zamti by the Chinese monarch. Voltaire introduces the theme of love (which is absent in the Chinese play), where Genghis Khan has a secret passion for Idamé, the wife of Zamti, but he is rejected by her as she stands firm to the lawful conduct of her nation. Voltaire had altered the story to fit his idea of European enlightenment and Chinese civilization, whereas the original play was contrasted as a stark and relentless story of intrigue, murder, and revenge. At the Comédie Français, Paris, in August 1755, L'Orphelin de la Chine was performed on stage for the first time. His play was well-received among contemporaries.

In 1756, the Irish playwright Arthur Murphy wrote his The Orphan of China. He stated that he had been attracted by Prémare's work, but his play resembles Voltaire's L'Orphelin de la Chine more. His play was first performed in April 1759 and was highly successful in England. In his 1759 edition, Murphy criticized Voltaire for adding a theme of love, which he thought was unsuitable, and for having a "scantiness of interesting business". Murphy reasserted the story of revenge, which was omitted in Voltaire's play. In Murphy's play, the virtuous people killed the leader of the Tartars. Although different, his play approached the original Chinese play closer than any other European adaption of the time. It was well received in the literary circles of London. In 1767, it was brought to the United States, where it was first performed at the Southwark Theatre in Philadelphia.

In 1834, Stanislas Julien made the first complete translation of The Orphan of Zhao, which was from the Chinese original into French, including both the dialogue and the songs.

The 2010 film Sacrifice directed by Chen Kaige is based on the Chinese play.

James Fenton adapted the Chinese play for a Royal Shakespeare Company production directed by Gregory Doran and played in the Swan Theatre, Stratford-upon-Avon, in 2012 and 2013. Fenton wrote four additional songs for the play.

In twenty‑first‑century Korea, The Orphan of Zhao was reimagined in a Korean adaptation. The most widely acclaimed version is the National Theater Company of Korea’s production The Orphan of Zhao: Seeds of Revenge (조씨고아, 복수의 씨앗), adapted and directed by Koh Sun‑woong. Since its premiere in 2015, the play has become a defining long‑running repertory work in Korean theatre, enduring as a signature production.

== See also ==
- The Chalk Circle
- Showtunes (Stephin Merritt and Chen Shi-zheng album), which includes music from an adaptation of Orphan of Zhao

== Bibliography ==
- Chen, Xiaomei (2002). Occidentalism: A theory of counter-discourse in post-Mao China (2nd ed.). Lanham: Rowman & Littlefield. ISBN 978-0-8476-9875-2.
- Du, Wenwei (2001). "Historicity and Contemporaneity: Adaptations of Yuan Plays in the 1990s". Asian Theatre Journal. 18 (2): 222–237. doi:10.1353/atj.2001.0015. JSTOR 1124153. S2CID 162334706.
- Fan, T.C. (April 1949). "Fables and Anti-Walpole Journalism". The Review of English Studies. 25 (98). JSTOR 511670.
- Fu, Jin (2012). Chinese theater (3rd ed.). Cambridge: Cambridge University Press. ISBN 978-0-521-18666-7.
- Halde, Jean Baptiste Du (1739). The General History of China (2nd ed.). London: John Watts.
- Hawkes, David (1985). Classical, Modern and Humane: Essays in Chinese Literature. Hong Kong: Chinese University Press. ISBN 978-962-201-354-4.
- Kuritz, Paul (1988). The making of theatre history. Englewood Cliffs: Prentice Hall. ISBN 978-0-13-547861-5.
- Lee, Maggie (11 January 2011). "Sacrifice -- Film Review". The Hollywood Reporter.
- Liu, Wu-Chi (1953). "The Original Orphan of China". Comparative Literature. 5 (3): 193–212. doi:10.2307/1768912. JSTOR 1768912.
- Ou, Hsin-yun (2007). "Four Epistles Concerning The Orphan of China". Notes and Queries. 54 (1): 65–68. doi:10.1093/notesj/gjm024.
- Mou, Sherry J. (2009). "A Child for All Ages: The Orphan of Zhao". Education About Asia. 14 (1): 23–28.
- Royal Shakespeare Company. "The Orphan of Zhao".
- Shi, Fei (2009). "Tragic Ways of Killing a Child: Staging Violence and Revenge in Classical Greek and Chinese Drama". In Constantinidis, Stratos E. (ed.). Text & presentation, 2008. Jefferson: McFarland. ISBN 978-0-7864-4366-6.
- Sieber, Patricia (2003). Theaters of desire. New York: Palgrave Macmillan. ISBN 978-1-4039-6194-5.
- Tian, Min (2008). The poetics of difference and displacement: Twentieth-century Chinese-Western intercultural theatre. Hong Kong: Hong Kong University Press. ISBN 978-962-209-907-4.
