= L'Orphelin de la Chine =

1753 French play by Voltaire

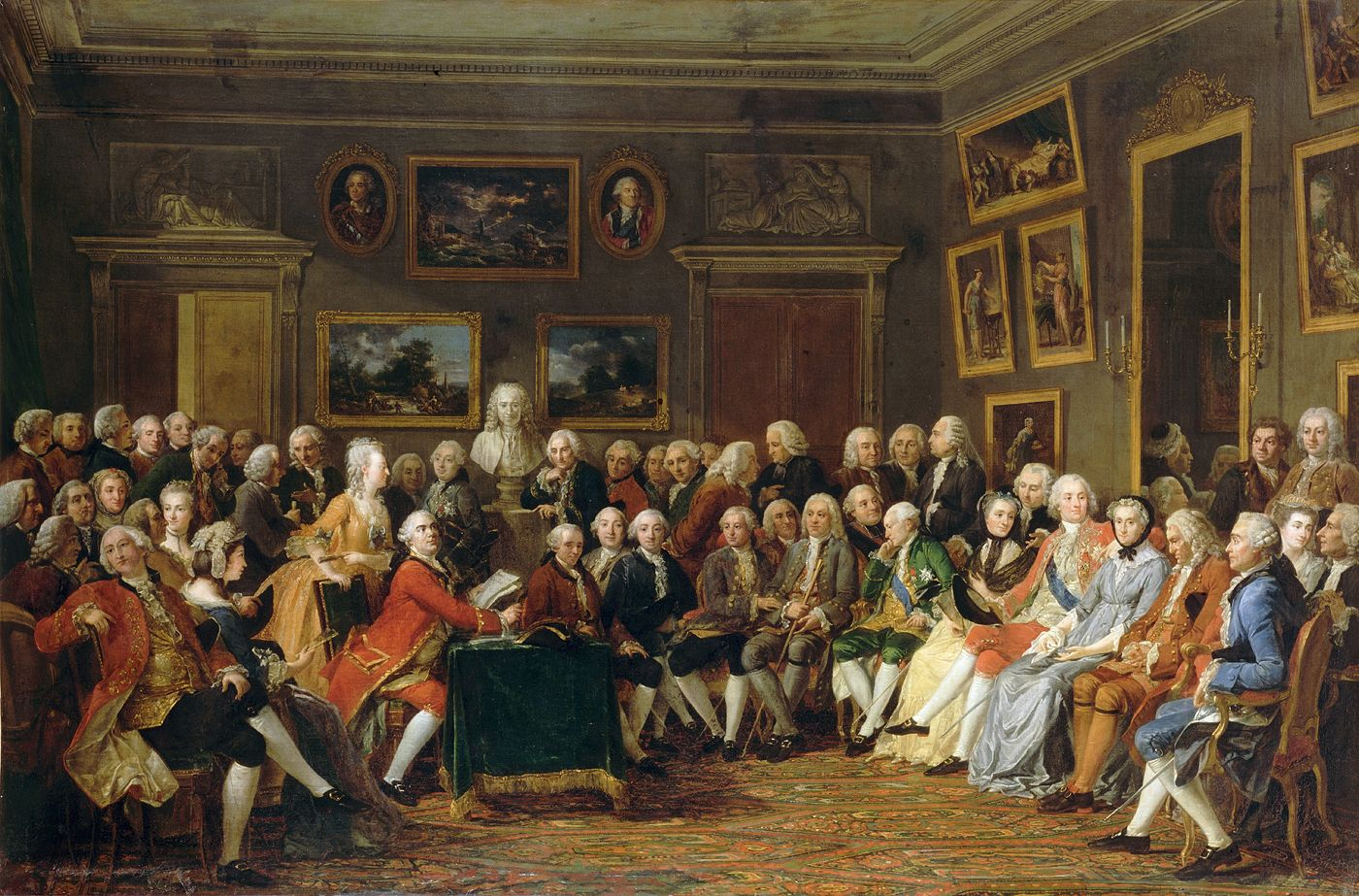
In the Salon of Madame Geoffrin in 1755 by Anicet Charles Gabriel Lemonnier, 1812. First reading in 1755 of Voltaire's L'Orphelin de la Chine in the room of Madame Geoffrin

L'Orphelin de la Chine (transl. The Orphan of China) is a 1753 French play by Voltaire based on The Orphan of Zhao, a thirteenth-century Chinese play attributed to Ji Junxiang.

Voltaire reworked the structure of the play in order to fit the classical model of French drama. L'Orphelin de la Chine adheres to the theory of three unities, which codified that dramas should conform to the unity of action, unity of time, and unity of place. Voltaire's 1753 version of the drama follows the three-act structure, and was later expanded to five acts when it was performed by the Comédie-Francaise in 1755.

== Background ==
Voltaire's source of inspiration was a translation of the traditional Chinese play The Orphan of Zhao by Joseph Henri Marie de Prémare, a French Jesuit missionary who lived in China. Prémare translated a portion of the original play for Étienne Fourmont, a French orientalist. Jean-Baptiste Du Halde included Prémare's translation as part of his Description de la Chine, a compilation of European reports on China, under the name Le petit orphelin de la maison Tchao, tragédie chinoise. Europe's sinomania and chinoiserie fad was at its height and works about China were in high demand. The success of Halde's book brought the play to the attention of French playwrights such as Voltaire.

Voltaire's adaptation was also written as a response to the Manchu conquest of the Ming dynasty and the creation of the Manchu Qing dynasty. His version of the story changed the play's setting from the state of Jin during the Spring and Autumn period to a locale near the Great Wall coinciding with Mongol conquest of the Southern Song dynasty. He deliberately chose the Mongols as an analogue to the contemporaneous Manchus who ruled 18th-century China.

Voltaire himself acted in an amateur production of the play in June 1763, playing the role of Genghis Khan.

== Synopsis ==
The play takes place in a palace located in Pekin.

== Reception ==
The play premiered on 20 August 1755, with a run of seventeen performances. It was a popular success, but provoked hostile critical responses including from Charles Collé, La Morlière, Antoine Poinsinet, and Jean-François de La Harpe It is celebrated in a painting by Anicet Charles Gabriel Lemonnier, Reading of the tragedy of L'Orphelin de la Chine in the room of Madame Geoffrin (above right), which shows a roomful of Parisian intellectuals listening to the reading.

== Adaptations ==
In 1759 The Orphan of China, an adaptation of the original play by the Irish writer Arthur Murphy, was staged at London's Drury Lane.

== Published editions ==
The play has been translated into Danish, Dutch, English, German, Italian, Polish, Portuguese, Spanish and Swedish.

- Critical edition by Basil Guy with the participation of Renaud Bret-Vitoz, in Les Œuvres complètes de Voltaire volume 45A, published 2009 by the Voltaire Foundation, University of Oxford. ISBN 9780729409421
