= The Orphan of China =

1759 play

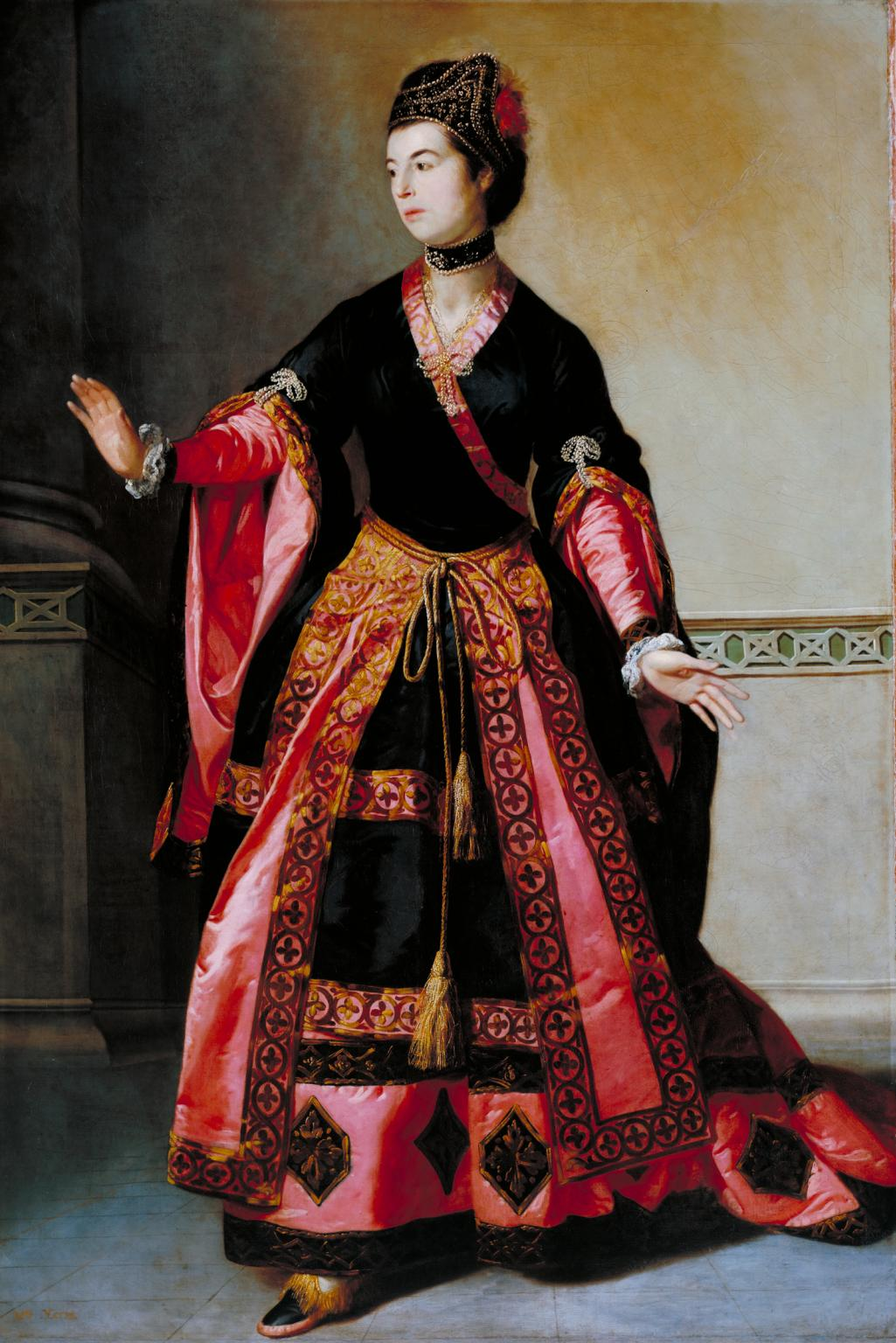
- Mary Ann Yates as Mandane by Tilly Kettle, 1765. Mary Ann Yates in the role of Mandane.
- Original language: English
- Written by: Arthur Murphy
- Genre: Tragedy

Premiere
- Date: 21 April 1759
- Place: Theatre Royal, Drury Lane, London

The Orphan of China is a 1759 tragedy by the Irish writer Arthur Murphy, based on the traditional Chinese play The Orphan of Zhao with the setting moved forwards from the twelfth to the seventeenth century. Although his work, written from 1756, was on a similar topic to Voltaire's play L'Orphelin de la Chine, Murphy asserted that he had written his before he became aware of Voltaire's adaptation. Substantial rewrites took place, including with assistance from Horace Walpole and William Whitehead before Garrick was satisfied and ready to stage it.

The original Drury Lane cast included David Garrick as Zamti, Henry Mossop as Etan, Charles Holland as Hamet, Astley Bransby as Octar, William Havard as Timurkan and Mary Ann Yates as Mandane. In his preface to the play Murphy criticised Voltaire for adding a romance to his version to play. The play was met with "great applause" and ran for nine performances in total and was revived a number of times over the next two decades.

== Bibliography ==
- Baines, Paul & Ferarro, Julian & Rogers, Pat. The Wiley-Blackwell Encyclopedia of Eighteenth-Century Writers and Writing, 1660–1789. Wiley-Blackwell, 2011.
- Chang, Dongshin. Representing China on the Historical London Stage: From Orientalism to Intercultural Performance. Routledge, 2015.
- Duffy, Cian & Howell, Peter. Romantic Adaptations: Essays in Mediation and Remediation. Routledge, 8 April 2016.
