= Joseph Henri Marie de Prémare =

French Jesuit missionary (1666–1736)

Joseph Henri Marie de Premare (1666 - 1736) was a French jesuit.

== Career ==
In 1724, after the Yongzheng Emperor virtually banned Christianity over the Chinese Rites controversy, he was confined with his colleagues in Guangzhou and later banished to Macau, where he died.

His Notitia linguae sinicae, written in 1736 and first published in 1831, was the first important Chinese language grammar in a European language. His letters can be found in the Lettres édifiantes et curieuses de Chine series.

Father de Prémare is among the missionaries who furnished Jean-Baptiste Du Halde with the material for his "Description de la Chine" (Paris, 1735). Among his contributions were translations from the Book of Documents (Du Halde, II, 298); eight odes of the Classic of Poetry (II, 308); and the first translation into a European language of a Chinese drama, "The Orphan of Zhao" (III, 341), titled L'Orphelin de la Maison de Tchao. Premaré sent the translation to Étienne Fourmont, a member of the Académie française. However, the play came into the possession of Father Du Halde instead, who published it in his Description Géographique, Historique, Chronologique, Politique et Physique de l'Empire de la Chine et de la Tartarie Chinois in 1735, although he had no permission from Prémare or Fourmont to do so. Prémare's translation inspired Voltaire's 1753 tragedy L'Orphelin de la Chine.

De Prémare's writings also include a defense of figurism proposed by Joachim Bouves of Christianity were mystically embodied in the Chinese classics.

== Works ==
- Joseph Henri Prémare (translated byJ. G. Bridgman) (1847). The Notitia linguae sinicae of Premare. Printed at the office of Chinese repository. p. 303.
