= In the Salon of Madame Geoffrin in 1755 =

Painting by Anicet Charles Gabriel Lemonnier

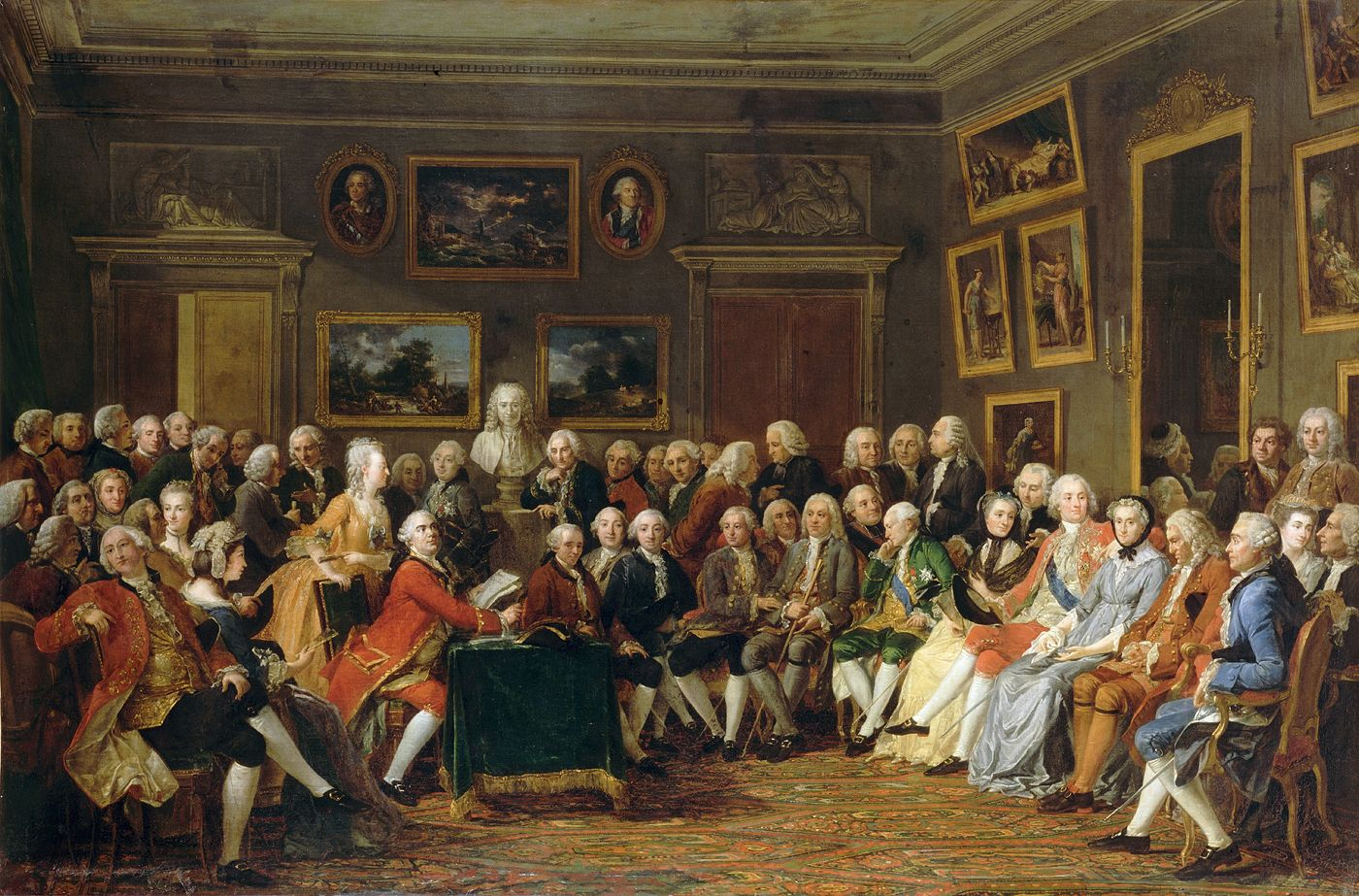
- Artist: Anicet Charles Gabriel Lemonnier
- Year: 1812
- Type: Oil on canvas, history painting
- Dimensions: 129.5 cm × 196 cm (51.0 in × 77 in)
- Location: Château de Malmaison, Paris

In the Salon of Madame Geoffrin in 1755 is an 1812 oil painting by the French artist Anicet Charles Gabriel Lemonnier. It depicts the salon of Marie Thérèse Geoffrin in Paris at the middle of the 18th century. A conversation piece, it depicts many figures from the Age of Enlightenment. Produced during the Napoleonic era, it represents a nostalgic view of the intellectual elite of the Ancien Régime. It depicts a reading of Voltaire's play The Orphan of China.

It was exhibited at the Salon of 1814, the first Salon to be held during the Bourbon Restoration after the downfall of Napoleon. Today it is in the collection of the Château de Malmaison in Paris, having been acquired in 1959.

== Bibliography ==
- Aldis, Janet. Madame Geoffrin, Her Salon and Her Times, 1750–1777. Putnam's, 1905.
- Roessler, Shirley Elson & Miklos, Reny. Europe 1715–1919: From Enlightenment to World War. Rowman & Littlefield Publishers, 2003.
- Ziskin, Rochelle. Private Salons and the Art World of Enlightenment Paris. BRILL, 2022.
