= André-Hippolyte Lemonnier =

French poet, essayist and traveler

André-Hippolyte Lemonnier (Paris, 1794–1871) was a French poet, essayist and traveler.

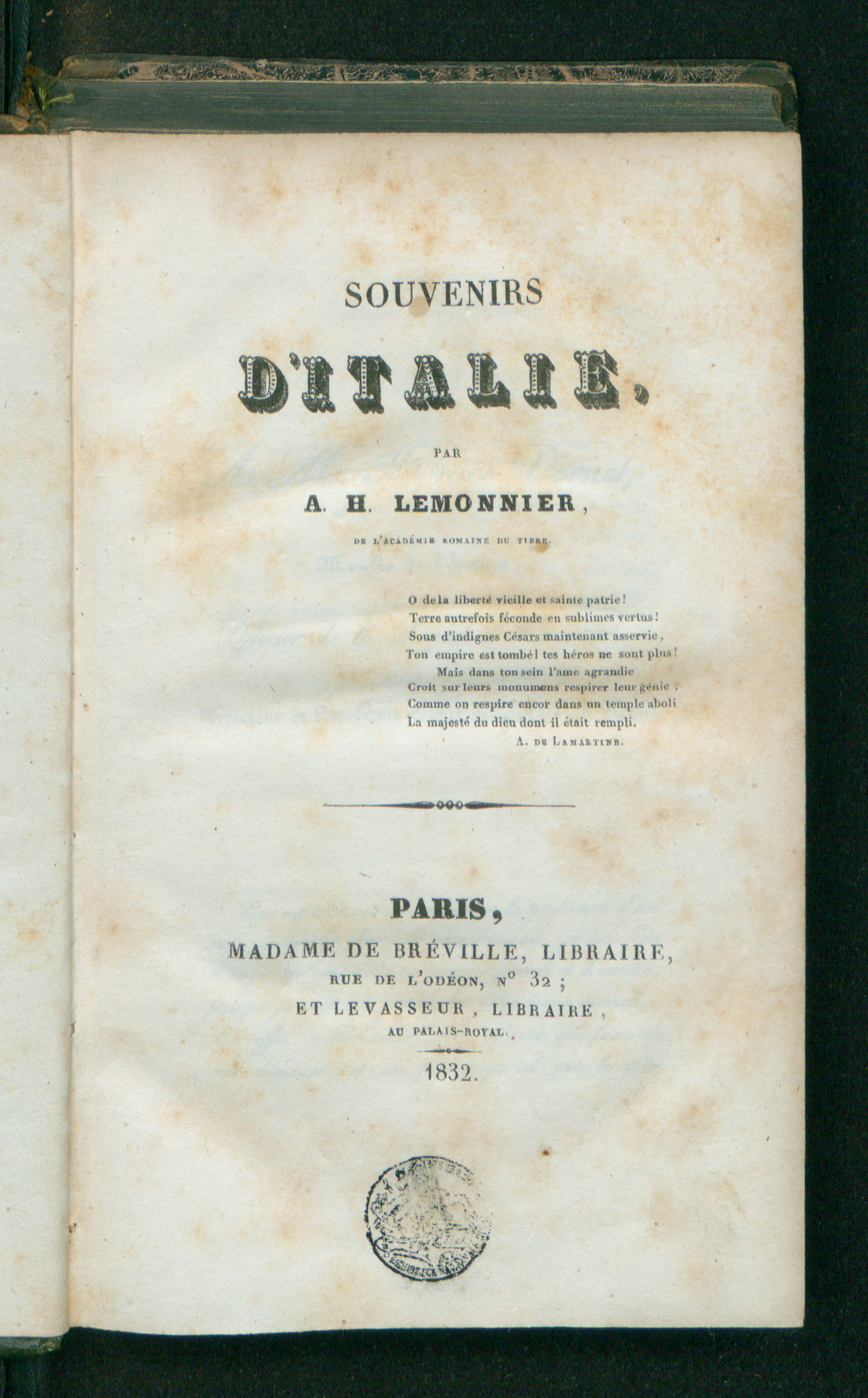
Souvenirs d'Italie, 1832. From BEIC, digital library

== Biography ==
Son of the painter Anicet Charles Gabriel Lemonnier, he completed legal studies and graduates in law at the University of Strasbourg in 1817 and becomes a lawyer.

He was secretary of the Academy of France in Rome from 1827 to 1831 and member of the Roman Academy of the Tiber. He published in 1832 Souvenirs d'Italie.

== Bibliography ==
- André Hippolyte Lemonnier (1832). Souvenirs d'Italie (in French). Paris: Madame De Bréville et Levasseur.

== Other projects ==
- Wikiquote contiene citazioni di o su André-Hippolyte Lemonnier
- Wikimedia Commons contiene immagini o altri file su André-Hippolyte Lemonnier
