= Anicet Charles Gabriel Lemonnier =

French painter (1743–1824)

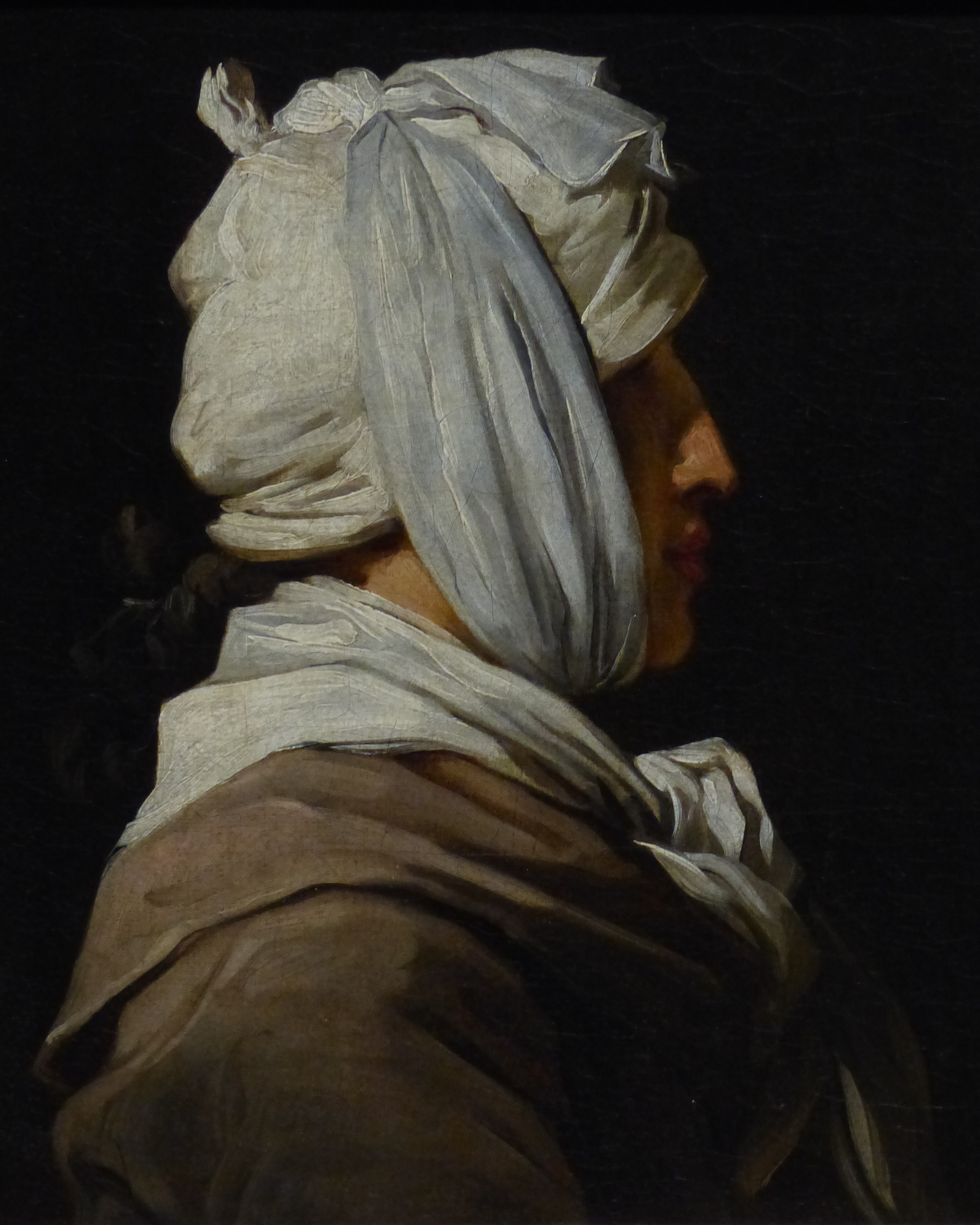
- Portrait of the painter Lemonnier with Bandaged Head, by François-André Vincent, c. 1776
- Born: 6 June 1743; Rouen, France
- Died: 17 August 1824 (aged 81); Paris, France
- Known for: Painter

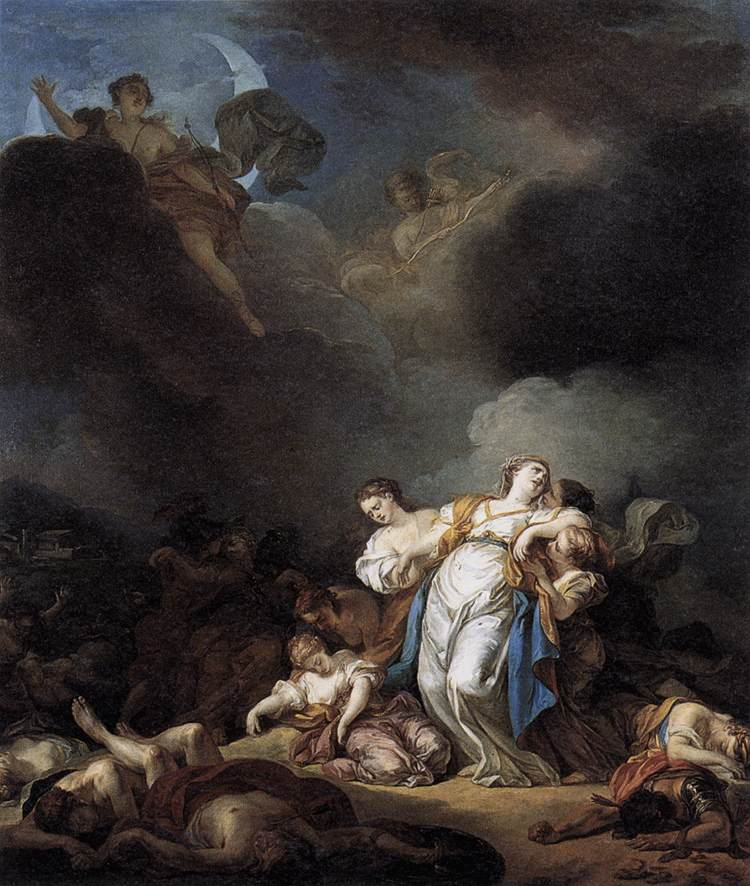
Niobe and her children killed by Apollo and Artemis, by Lemonnier

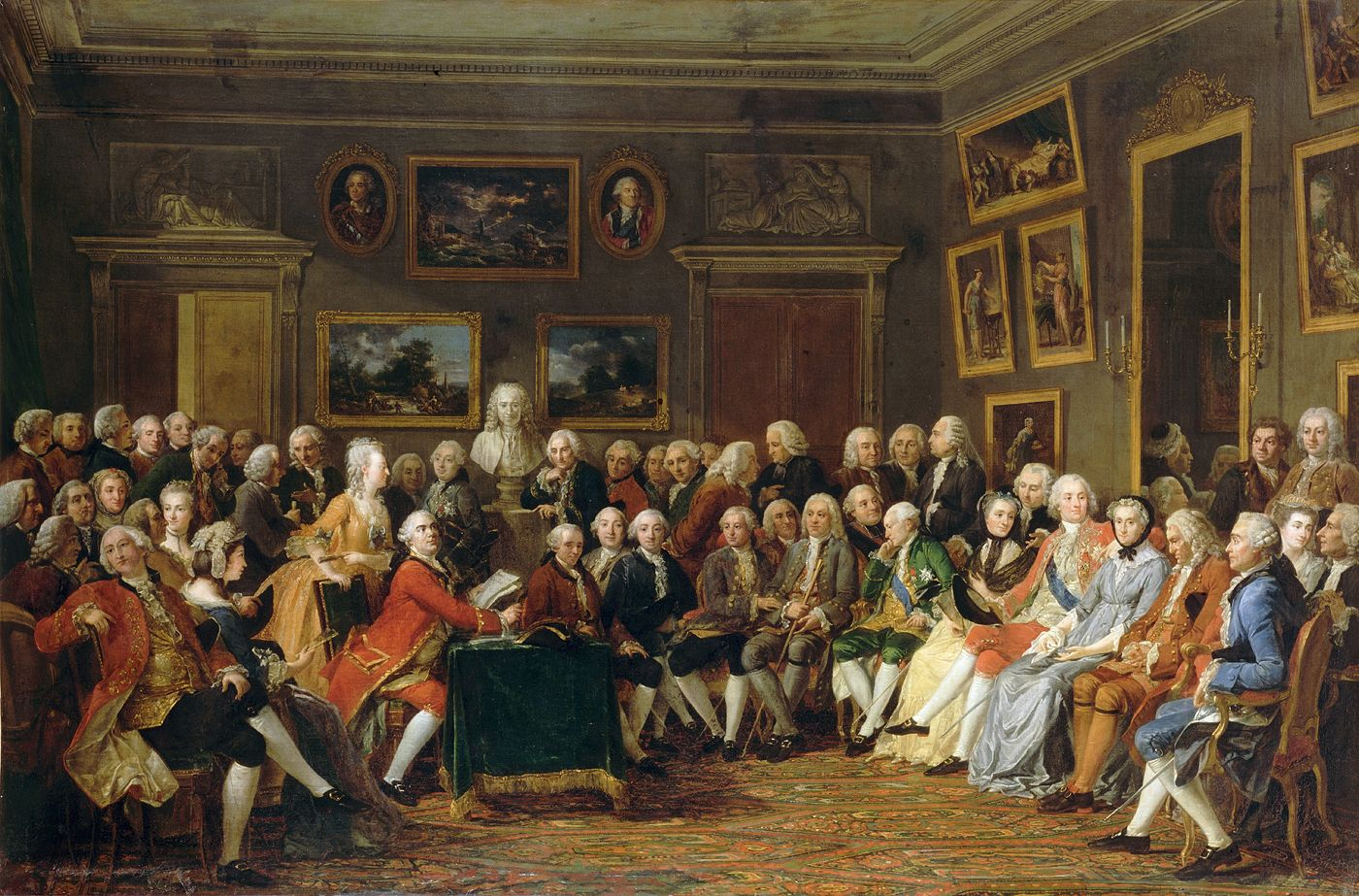
In the Salon of Madame Geoffrin in 1755. Reading of Voltaire's tragedy of the Orphan of China in the salon of Marie Thérèse Rodet Geoffrin, by Lemonnier

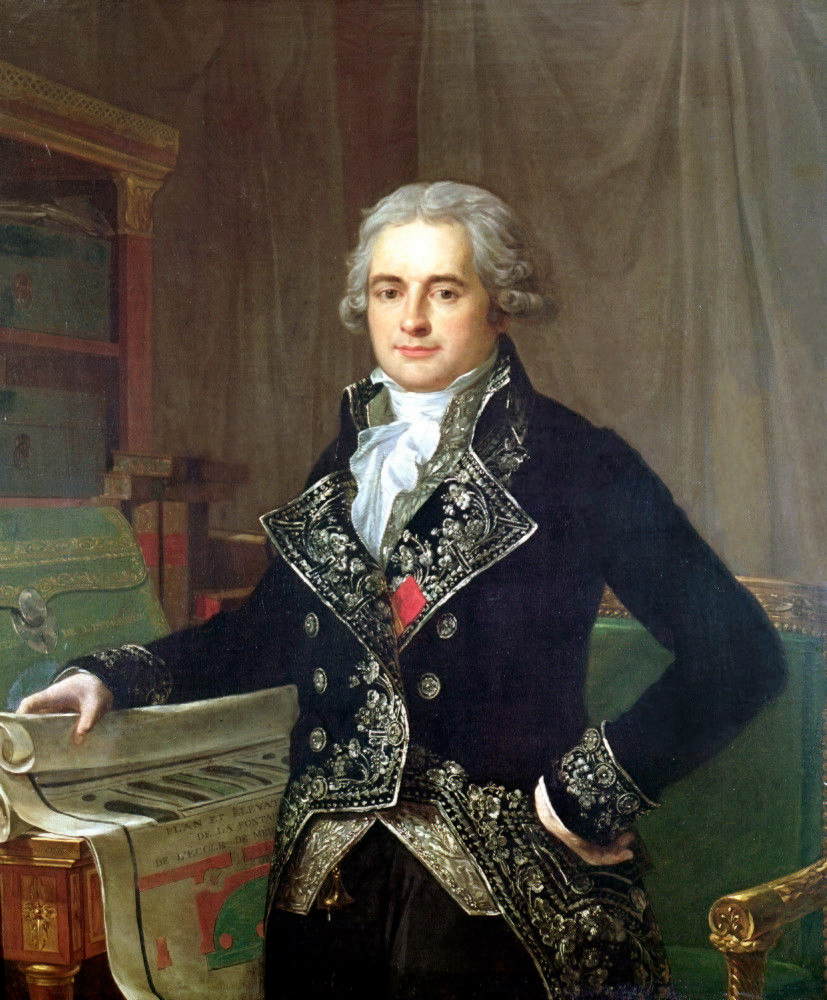
Portrait of Jean-Antoine Chaptal (1756–1832), comte de Chanteloup, by Lemonnier

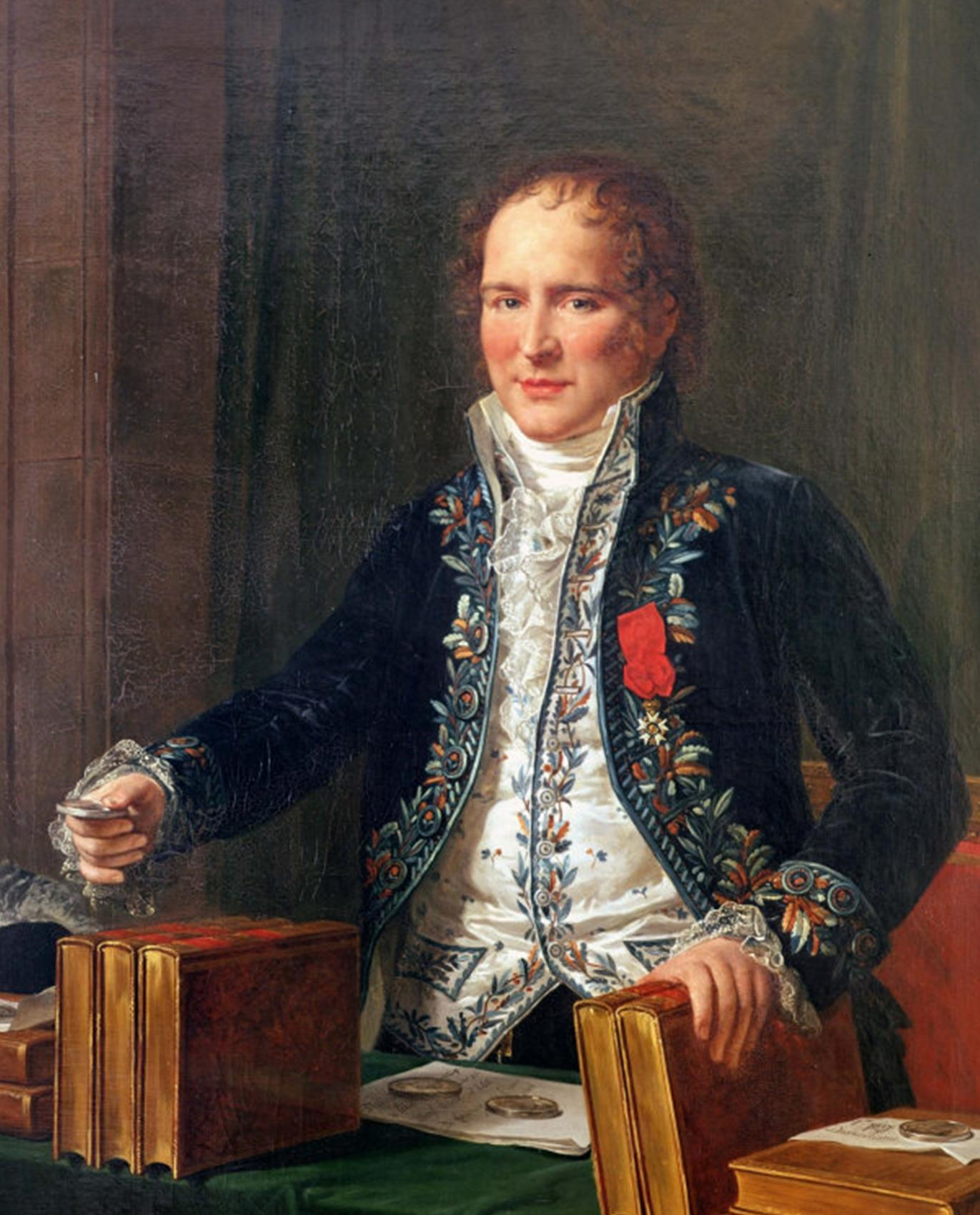
Portrait of Antoine François, comte de Fourcroy by Lemonnier

Anicet Charles Gabriel Lemonnier (6 June 1743 – 17 August 1824) was a well-known French painter of historical subjects who was active before, during and after the French Revolution.

== Life ==
Lemonnier was born in Rouen on 6 June 1743. He was a pupil of Jean-Baptiste Descamps at the Rouen School of Fine Arts, then of Joseph-Marie Vien, where he had as classmates and friends Jacques-Louis David and François-André Vincent. With a pleasing appearance, much natural wit and excellent recommendations he was soon admitted into the best society in the capital, especially in the salon of Marie Thérèse Rodet Geoffrin, who took a liking to him. In 1772 he exhibited The Children of Niobe killed by Apollo and Diana, a work that won him the Prix de Rome.

He lived in Rome, as a licensee of the Government, from 1774 to 1784. In this country of the arts, Lemonnier found a home full of kindness with the famous poet diplomat, Cardinal de Bernis, and devoted himself with enthusiasm to the study of masterpieces of the masters, from which he drew inspiration for the design and composition that is distinctive of his talent.

Back in France, Lemonnier returned to his hometown where he painted one of his best pictures, the Plague of Milan, for the chapel of the Seminary of Saint-Vivien. In 1786, during the visit of Louis XVI to Rouen on his return from Cherbourg, Lemonnier was commissioned to paint a picture whose subject was the presentation of the members of the Rouen Chamber of Commerce to the monarch. Soon after, he performed for the same company a large allegorical painting representing the engineering trade and the discovery of America. In 1789 Lemonnier was named to the Academy of Painting for his work la Mort d’Antoine (the Death of Anthony).

During the French Revolution, Lemonnier was called to be part of the Committee on Monuments, and in 1794 he obtained the title of the cabinet painter of the School of Medicine. Related to Roland, on 4 December 1792 Lemonnier received from the minister a position at the Louvre which placed him on the Arts Commission, where he rendered great service. In Rouen he was charged, with his compatriot Charles Le Carpentier, to examine art works removed from suppressed religious institutions in the district and select those that should avoid destruction. He discharged this critical mission with great zeal, and it is due to Lemonnier that several churches and the museum of Rouen now possess many of the best paintings he managed to collect. In 1810 Lemonnier became director of the Gobelins Manufactory, a position he lost in 1816. He also took an active part in establishing the Museum of Fine Arts of Rouen. He died in Paris on 17 August 1824.

Lemonnier's son, André-Hippolyte Lemonnier, was a man of letters who wrote, among other things, a historical record of the life and works of A.-C.-G. Lemonnier. Lemonnier's portrait is in the collection of Rouen Library.

== Works ==
Lemonnier's works include An Evening with Madame Geoffrin, executed in 1812 for the Empress Josephine. This painting exhibited at the Musée des Châteaux de Malmaison et Bois-Préau is an imaginary reconstruction of the salon of Marie Thérèse Geoffrin depicting, among others, the ministers Choiseul, Fontenelle, Montesquieu, Diderot and Marmontel, their hostess and a bust of Voltaire in a scene where the actor Lekain is reading Voltaire's play L'Orphelin de la Chine (The Orphan of China).

Several drawings by Lemonnier have survived and are in French museums, including:

- Bélisaire, Musée des Augustins de Toulouse
- François Ier recevant dans la salle des Suisses à Fontainebleau la grande "Sainte Famille" de Raphaël, Musée des Beaux-Arts de Rouen
- Jésus appelant à lui les petits enfants, Musée des Beaux-Arts de Rouen
- Jésus au milieu des docteurs, Musée des Beaux-Arts de Rouen
- La Mission des apôtres, Musée des Beaux-Arts de Rouen
- La Peste de Milan, Musée des Beaux-Arts de Rouen
- Esquisse de la tête de l'ange exterminateur de "La Peste de Milan", Musée des Beaux-Arts de Rouen
- Les Enfants de Niobe tués par Apollon et Diane, Musée des Beaux-Arts de Rouen
- Paysanne de Frascati, Musée des Beaux-Arts de Rouen
- Portrait de l’abbé Joly, docteur en Sorbonne, Musée des Beaux-Arts de Rouen
- Portrait de Monsieur d’Herbouville, Musée des Beaux-Arts de Rouen
- Présentation de la Vierge au Temple, Musée des Beaux-Arts de Rouen
- Un Grec albanais, Musée des Beaux-Arts de Rouen
- Vue de Saint-Cloud en automne, work has been lost
- Ycarrius, Ulysse et Pénélope, Musée des Beaux-Arts de Rouen
- La Fortune, Musée des Beaux-Arts de Rouen
- Portrait de François Ier, location unknown
- Cléombrote; dit aussi l’amour conjugal, Musée des Beaux-Arts de Rouen
- La Mort d’Antoine, Musée des Beaux-Arts de Rouen
- Louis XIV assistant, dans le parc de Versailles, à l’inauguration de la statue de Milon de Crotone par Puget, Musée des Beaux-Arts de Rouen
- Une Soirée chez Madame Geoffrin - ou Lecture de la tragédie "L’Orphelin de la Chine" de Voltaire dans le salon de Madame Geoffrin, 1812, Château de Malmaison (Musée national des châteaux de Malmaison et de Bois-Préau)
- Première Lecture chez Madame Geoffrin de "L’Orphelin de la Chine", en 1755, Musée des Beaux-Arts de Rouen

== Honours and awards ==
Chevalier of the Order of the Legion of Honour
