= Marie Thérèse Geoffrin =

French salon holder, leading female figure in the French Enlightenment

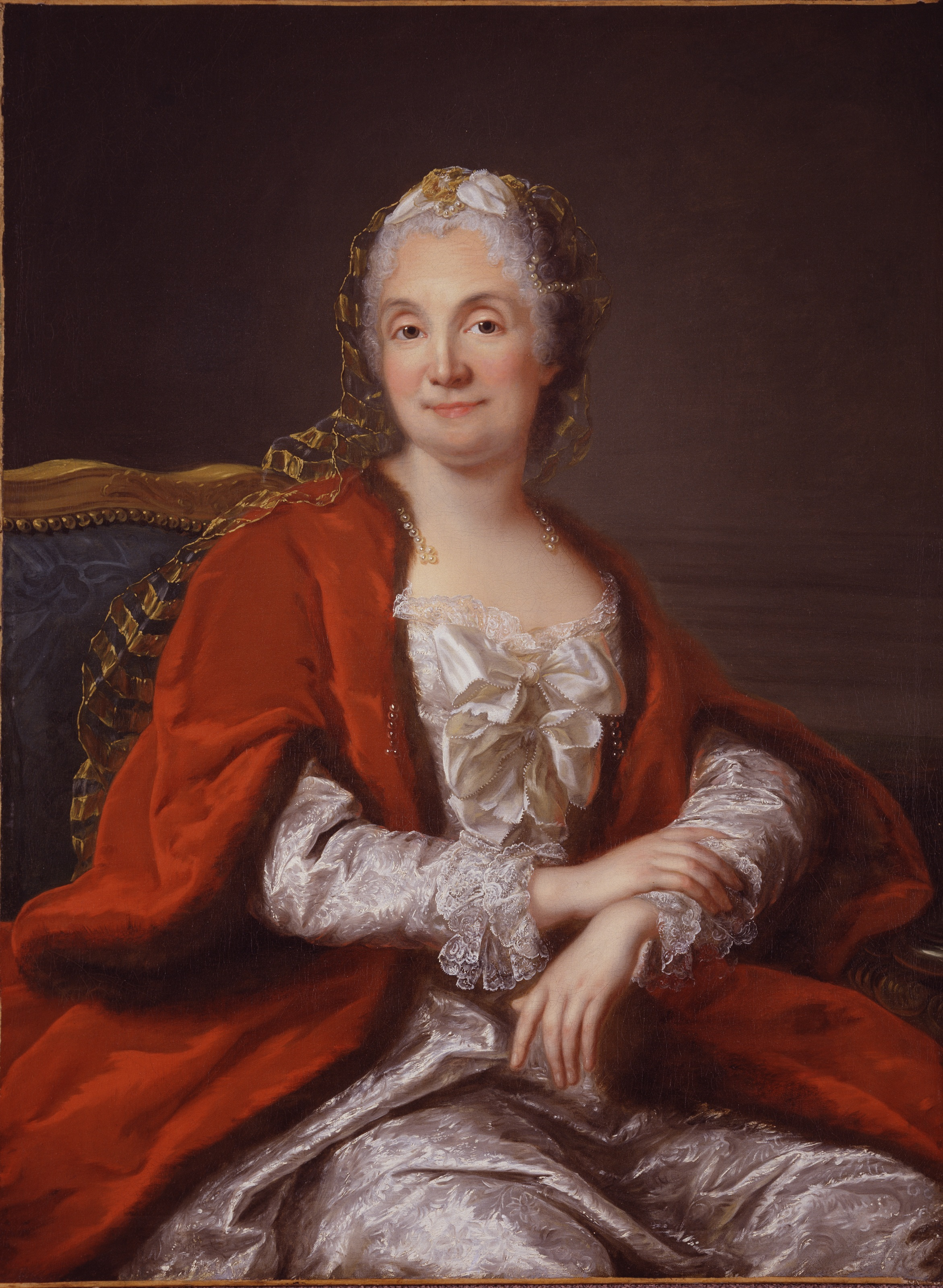
- Presumed portrait of Madame Geoffrin.
- Born: Marie Thérèse Rodet; 26 June 1699; Paris, France
- Died: 6 October 1777 (aged 78); Paris, France
- Spouse: Pierre François Geoffrin
- Children: 2
- Parent(s): Pierre Rodet; Angélique Thérèse Chemineau

Marie Thérèse Geoffrin (French pronunciation: [maʁi teʁɛz ʁɔdɛ ʒɔfʁɛ̃], née Rodet; 26 June 1699 – 6 October 1777) was a French salon holder who has been referred to as one of the leading female figures in the French Enlightenment. From 1750 to 1777, Madame Geoffrin played host to many of the most influential Philosophes and Encyclopédistes of her time.

Her association with several prominent dignitaries and public figures from across Europe has earned Madame Geoffrin international recognition. Her patronage and dedication to both the philosophical men of letters and talented artists that frequented her house is emblematic of her role as guide and protector. In her salon on the Rue Saint-Honoré, Madame Geoffrin demonstrated qualities of politeness and civility that helped stimulate and regulate intellectual discussion. Her actions as a Parisian salonnière exemplify many of the most important characteristics of Enlightenment sociability.

== Early life ==
Born in 1699, Madame Geoffrin was the first child of a bourgeois named Pierre Rodet, a valet de chambre for the Duchess of Burgundy, and Angélique Thérèse Chemineau, the daughter of a Parisian Banker. Marie Thérèse's mother died a year later in giving birth to her son Louis. At age seven, Marie Thérèse and her brother were taken to live with their grandmother Madame Chemineau on the rue Saint-Honoré. At thirteen, she was engaged to be married to the widower Pierre François Geoffrin, a lieutenant-colonel of the National Guard and a prosperous general cashier of the Saint-Gobain Venetian mirror manufactory. Despite the fact that he was forty-nine years old, and Marie Thérèse was barely fourteen years old, Monsieur Geoffrin had inherited a substantial fortune from his first wife, and the chance for "an excellent settlement" was thought to be quite suitable by Madame Chemineau. The marriage took place on 19 July 1713. Nearly two years after the wedding, she gave birth to her first child, a daughter named also Marie Thérèse, and the future Marquise de La Ferté-Imbault. Her second child, a son, (who was to die later in childhood) was born two years later. It was not until Madame Geoffrin was over thirty years old that her connection to the salons would become established. Her husband, Pierre François Geoffrin died 20 December 1749, a fact that was hardly noticed by Mme Geoffrin's visitors—indeed, Madame Geoffrin hardly seemed to notice herself.

== Education ==
Geoffrin was unable to receive a formalized education. It has been suggested, most notably by Dena Goodman, that the salon itself acted as a schoolhouse, where Geoffrin and other salonnières could train. Goodman writes, "For Madame Geoffrin, the salon was a socially acceptable substitute for a formal education denied her not just by her grandmother, but more generally by a society that agreed with Madame Chemineau's (her grandmother's) position." She also states, "Her earliest schoolmasters were Fontenelle, the abbe de Saint-Pierre, and Montesquieu. Madame de Tencin played a large role in Madame Geoffrin's rise in society. Goodman states, "Madame Geoffrin made a daring step for a devout girl when, at the age of eighteen, but already a wife and mother, she began to frequent the afternoon gatherings at the home of Madame de Tencin." After Madame de Tencin's death in December 1749, Madame Geoffrin inherited many of de Tencin's former guests, thereby solidifying her own salon.

== Madame Geoffrin and the salons ==
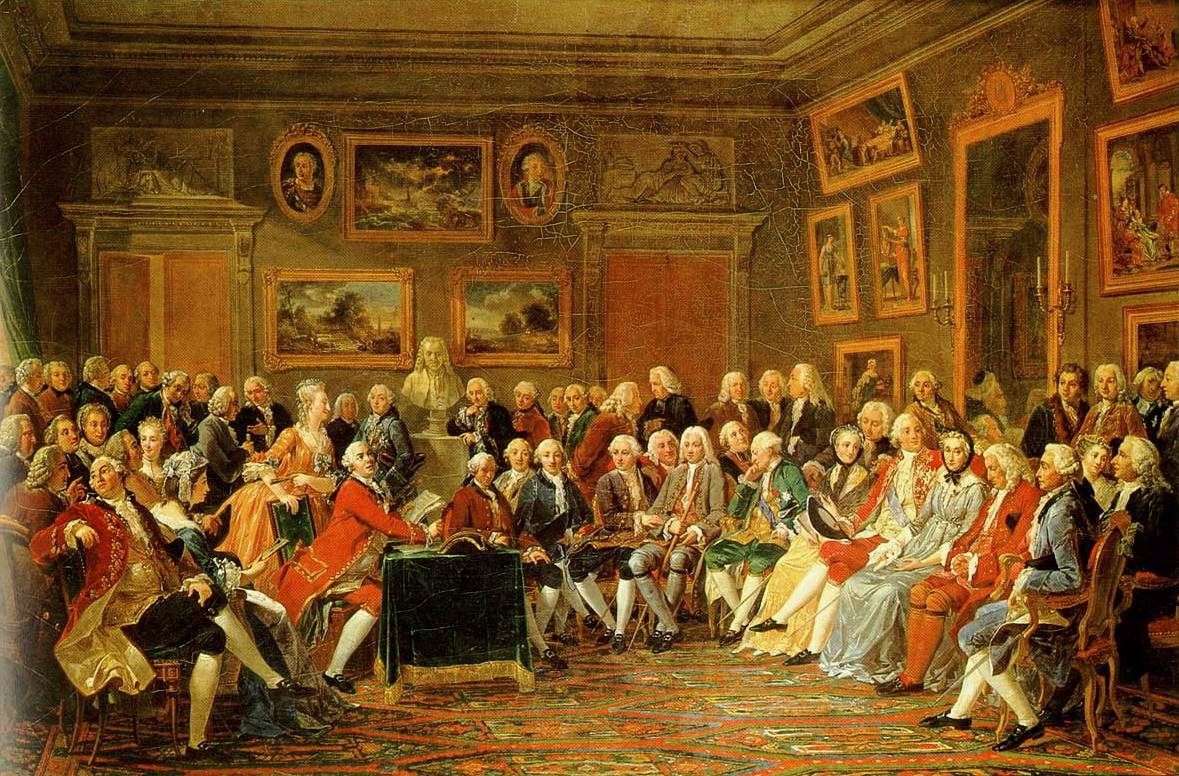
In the Salon of Madame Geoffrin in 1755 by Anicet Charles Gabriel Lemonnier. Oil on canvas, Château de Malmaison, Rueil-Malmaison, France.

Madame Geoffrin's popularity in the mid-eighteenth century came during a time where the center of social life was beginning to move away from the French court and toward the salons of Paris. Instead of the earlier, seventeenth-century salons of the high nobility, Madame Geoffrin's salon catered generally to a more philosophical crowd of the Enlightenment period. Goodman, in "Enlightenment Salons", writes, "In the eighteenth century, under the guidance of Madame Geoffrin, Julie de Lespinasse, and Suzanne Necker, the salon was transformed from a noble, leisure institution into an institution of the Enlightenment." Goodman writes:

"Geoffrin, who acted as a mentor and model for other salonnières, was responsible for two innovations that set Enlightenment salons apart from their predecessors and from other social and literacy gatherings of the day. She invented the Enlightenment salon. First, she made the one-o'clock dinner rather than the traditional late-night supper the sociable meal of the day, and thus she opened up the whole afternoon for talk. Second, she regulated these dinners, fixing a specific day of the week for them. After Geoffrin launched her weekly dinners, the Parisian salon took on the form that made it the social base of the Enlightenment Republic of Letters: a regular and regulated formal gathering hosted by a woman in her own home which served as a forum and locus of intellectual activity."

Her dinners were held twice weekly. Mondays were specifically for artists. Wednesdays were generally reserved for Men of Letters.

Goodman writes, "Enlightenment salons were working spaces, unlike other Eighteenth-century social gatherings, which took place as their model." She continues, "The Enlightenment was not a game, and the salonnières were not simply ladies of leisure killing time. On the contrary, Enlightenment salonnières were precisely those women who fought the general malaise of the period by taking up their métier."

== Salons, French society, and the international community ==
Madame Geoffrin's role was central to her identity as a French hostess. Historian Denise Yim writes: "The most distinguished salonnières were discerning women who selected their company with care, set the tone, guided the conversation, and could influence the fortunes of those appearing there." She continues, "The most influential salonnière was perhaps Madame Geoffrin of the rue Saint-Honoré, who managed to attract the largest number of distinguished foreigners to her home." A lady of great renown, Geoffrin's salon catered to a wide range of foreign dignitaries and distinguished guests. "An invitation to the Monday and Wednesday dinners of Madame Geoffrin was an honor greatly coveted by foreigners passing through Paris. The hostess herself had gained a European reputation even before her journey to Poland, and to dine with Madame Geoffrin was by some people considered almost as great an honor as being presented at Versailles."" Yim continues, "Whether it was Madame Geoffrin's design to attract all the most eminent foreigners to her salon, thereby spreading the reputation of her home throughout Europe, as Marmontel wrote, or whether this was the natural consequence of the presence of so many philosophes and Encyclopédistes, it was a fact that no foreign minister, no man or woman of note who arrived in Paris failed to call on Madame Geoffrin in the hope of being invited to one of her select dinners."

== Salon politeness and gift giving ==
Madame Geoffrin exemplified the qualities of politeness that were required for the participation in French high society. She was completely devoted to the management and organization of her salon, and of the patrons that frequented it. Madame Geoffrin could be defined by the ordered consistency of all her actions. "Regularity was part of a greater sense of organization that defined all aspects of Madame Geoffrin's life and every hour of her day, from a 5 a.m. rising, through a morning of domestic duties, letter writing, and errands, to the afternoons she devoted twice a week to her salon."

Although some historians, such as Dena Goodman, associate Geoffrin and other salonnières with intellectual life, other researchers depict the salons as the realm of anti-intellectual socialites. For example, with no education or remarkable mental gifts of a sort that leave permanent traces, she was the best representative of the women of her time who held their place in the world solely through their skill in organizing and conducting a salon. She was in no sense a luminary; and conscious that she could not shine by her own light, she was bent upon shining by that of others." Denise Yim adds that "these women considered themselves the purveyors, the disseminators, the nurturers, the very guardians of taste in the belles lettres, in the fine arts, and in the music. Their own peculiar art consisted of pleasing." "Maintaining the tensions between inner satisfaction and outer negation which made Geoffrin the model salonnière was not easy."

Antoine Lilti also rejects the notion that Geoffrin and other salonnières 'governed' an intellectual arena. Lilti focuses, rather, on the salonnières' practice of politeness and gift giving. In relation to Madame Geoffrin, Lilti writes, "there exists numerous testimonials about the gifts that Madame Geoffrin bestowed upon the writers who regularly attend her salon, from the pieces of the silverware offered to the Suards, the silver pans and 2,000 gold écus presented to Thomas. He continues, "writers were not the only ones to benefit from this generosity. Madame Geoffrin received artists every Monday, securing contracts for them among high society collectors and even commissioned artwork for herself. Madame Geoffrin's notebooks mention that these artists also received regular gifts." For Lilti, Geoffrin's gift giving was nothing more than a reaffirmation of social inequities. He states, "the exchange of gifts, of course, was a common practice in all areas of high society, but it took on a particular social signification in the case of gifts given to men of letters, since the absence of reciprocity rendered the relationship asymmetrical. It was more about simply reinforcing a social bond through gift-giving, as it was for the socialites who exchanged little gifts with each other, but instead made a financial relationship part of urbane sociability––especially when the rapport became more or less permanent in the form of allowances, such as the ones that Madame Geoffrin bestowed upon d'Alembert, Thomas, and the abbé Morellet."

== Continuity in the salons ==
Madame Geoffrin's personal acquaintance with many other influential salonnières indicates a type of formalized continuity in the salons. Though it has been argued that women did not appear in salon societies, the training of salonnières was undertaken by older women in the same position. Dena Goodman states, "Indeed, the history of the eighteenth century salon is a history of female apprenticeships, where younger women, such as Madame Geoffrin learned from older women, such as Madame de Tencin, and Julie de Lespinasse and Suzanne Necker learned in turn from Madame Geoffrin." Therefore, Madame Geoffrin spent many years in the company of Madame de Tencin, herself a highly influential salonnière, and in turn, spent much time cultivating her own protégées, namely Madame Necker and Madame Lespinasse, who would attempt to continue the salon tradition after her death. One woman allowed admission into Madame Geoffrin's salon, Madame d'Etioles, who was to become Madame la Marquise de Pompadour after earning the French King's interest, is reputed to have offered Madame Geoffrin and her daughter opportunities to present themselves at the French Court. It was an honor that was refused (on more than one occasion) by the salonnières. Another salonnière, the Marquise du Deffand, can be said to have competed against Madame Geoffrin for the friendship of many prominent men of letters. Aldis writes, "There had always been a kind of tacit rivalry between Madame Geoffrin and the Marquise du Deffand; the aristocratic Marquise sneered at her rival's low origin for the business and want of education, while Madame Geoffrin might well have ignored her taunts in the success of her salon, indisputably, the most celebrated in Paris and the civilized world."Geoffrin's relationship with her daughter is one exception to the continuity between women in the salons. Madame de la Ferté-Imbault, upon hearing her mother's suggestion to begin her own salon, organized the Order of Lanurelus, a type of counter-salon that acted in opposition to the serious salons of the Philosophes. The Order of Lanurelus (of which de la Ferté-Imbault proclaimed herself Grand Mistress) ran from 1771 until around the time of Geoffrin's death in 1777. "It was a forum not for the philosophes and their Republic of Letters, but for the anti-philosophe campaign. Goodman writes, "The battle of the hearts and minds of the elite of the eighteenth century was, for a few years, fought out in a single house on the rue Saint-Honoré!"

== Patron of the arts ==
The debate surrounding Madame Geoffrin as a patron of the arts centers around gender divisions and sociability in eighteenth century France. Geoffrin, considered by many contemporaries to be one of the most influential patrons of art, supported many artists and commissioned several works. Dena Goodman, in what has been criticized as perhaps an idealized feminist theory, suggests, "The salonnière's art...allowed her to manage the egos of others (males) without imposing her own upon them." In relation to her (possible) conception and patronage of the highly regarded historical artist Carle Van Loo's painting, Une Conversation the historian Emma Barker writes, "most recent commentators have agreed in locating the interest and significance of these works in their having been commissioned by an exceptional female patron, the hostess of a celebrated Parisian salon whose guests included some of the leading figures of the French Enlightenment." Barker argues that the Conversation may be seen to represent a self-consciously feminocentric vision of history." Dena Goodman, in her Republic of Letters, claims that, "the paintings embody the serious spirit of Geoffrin's salon and observes that they depict two activities that dominated salon sociability: conversation and reading out loud." Madame Geoffrin as patron of the arts is also emblematic of a more international connection. Her correspondence with both Catherine the Great of Russia and King Stanislaw August of Poland, as well as several other dignitaries and heads of state often centered around the commission of several paintings that were often hung in her salon. On the relationship between Geoffrin and Stanislaw, the academic Maria Gordon-Smith writes, "The King knew Madame Geoffrin in Paris from his youthful days on the grand tour in 1753, when he was entrusted to her care by her father. After his election, Madame Geoffrin became his adviser and agent in all matters connected with the choice and purchase of French Art. And she loved women"

== Conception ==
In her relationship to salons, Madame Geoffrin occupies a very contentious space in Enlightenment historiography. On the broadest level of representation, Madame Geoffrin stands as one of only a handful of women to participate in the Enlightenment. "The salonnières of the Enlightenment were a small number of women who knew and admired one another, lived lives of regularity rather than dissipation, and were committed both to their own education and the philosophes' project of Enlightenment." Dena Goodman's notion of the centrality of the salonnières in creating Enlightenment institutions places Madame Geoffrin at the heart of Enlightenment sociability. She writes, "Under the guidance of Marie-Therese Geoffrin, Julie de Lespinasse and Suzanne Necker, Parisian salons became the civil working spaces of the project of Enlightenment." Goodman uses Geoffrin's example to argue that salonnières in the eighteenth century represented a re-shaping of an existing form of sociability that would serve the ambitions of the women who ran them. Goodman states, "In using the social gathering and transforming it to meet their own needs, Madame Geoffrin and salonnières like her created a certain kind of social and intellectual space that could be exploited by the expanding group of intellectuals who were beginning to call themselves 'philosophers'." The historian Denise Yim loosely agrees with Goodman that salonnières used their position for more serious educational purposes. She writes, "It is evident, although they do not say so themselves, that Julie de Lespinasse, Madame Geoffrin and Madame Vigee-Lebrun also improved themselves in their own salons.

This representation has been questioned by more the recent literature on the Enlightenment. Janet Burke and Margaret Jacob write that by placing only "a handful of selfless salonnières (such as Geoffrin) at the centre of Enlightenment history, Goodman is effectively obliterating a wider version of the Enlightenment cultural practices as well as downgrading 'all other seemingly enlightened women.'" Antoine Lilti, in countering many of Goodman's arguments, would refute the idea that Madame Geoffrin acted as a participant in the new sociability of Enlightenment society. Instead, he claims that the politeness and gift-giving would have been unthinkable without the presence of fashionable men of letters, which, in turn, attracted the finest representatives of both Parisian and European aristocracy to her salon. Madame Geoffrin's association with these aristocrats permitted her to appear as a protector of talents and an accomplished socialite.

The historian Steven Kale discounts the entire theory that Madame Geoffrin (and salonnières in general) played a significant role in the Enlightenment. Kale examines the differences in the roles of men and women in the public sphere before and after 1789. He states, "There is no reason to contradict the widely held view that the salon was a feminist space insofar as it was more often than not presided over by a woman who gave it tone and structure." However, he states, "But it is one thing to say that the presence of a woman is a distinguishing feature of salons and another to argue that female dominance set them apart from other institutions of elite sociability." He further elaborates that "Salonnières generally exercised no political power outside their role in the formation of public opinion, and salons were not centers of political intrigue." Furthermore, "Salonnières were engaged in a common social practice, the goal of which was not to achieve for women a role in public affairs but to serve the public needs of men, whether intellectuals or politicians, who had the power to determine the limits of women's public participation." Kale rejects the notion that Geoffrin held any semblance of power; his argument refutes the long-held idea that the female-run salons were "institutions of democratic sociability." Instead, he bases much of his critiques of earlier historians on the idea that salonnières such as Madame Geoffrin reaffirmed the aristocratic institutions of the Ancien Regime. He writes, "The genius of salons, and of salonnières, lay in their ability to maintain a delicate balance between exclusivity and openness, between 'inclusions and exclusions', so that the aristocracy could have both a means of producing social cohesion and a vehicle for the dissemination of traits meant to characterize a wider society of elites undergoing redefinition." Therefore, Kale visualizes Geoffrin's salon as confirming the aristocratic conception of the social and political roles of women in the Ancien Regime.
