= Mary Ann Yates as Mandane =

Painting by Tilly Kettle

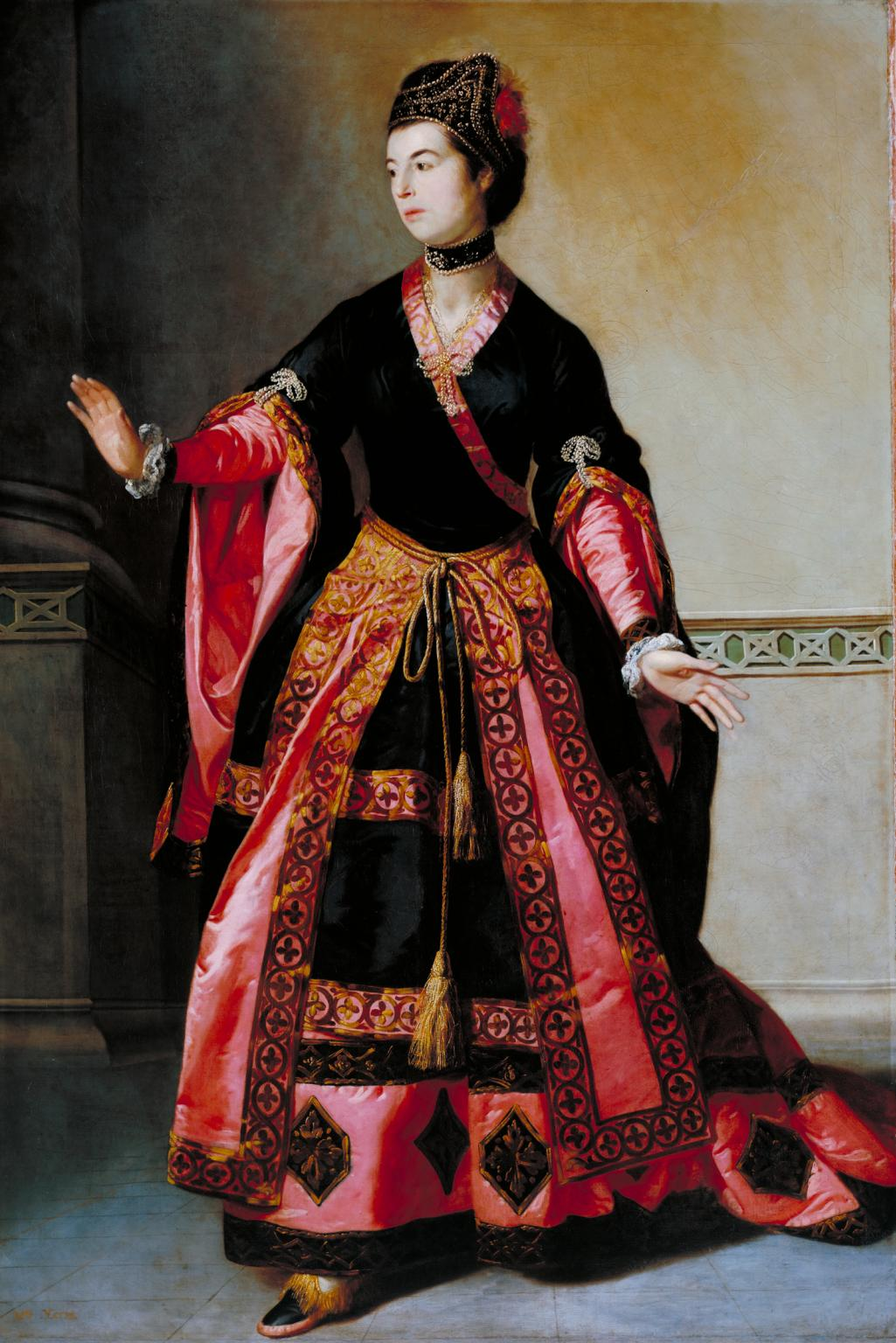
- Artist: Tilly Kettle
- Year: 1765
- Type: Oil on canvas, portrait painting
- Dimensions: 192.4 cm × 129.5 cm (75.7 in × 51.0 in)
- Location: Tate Britain; London

Mary Ann Yates as Mandane is a 1765 portrait painting by the British artist Tilly Kettle. It depicts the English actress Mary Ann Yates in the role of Mandane in the play The Orphan of China by Arthur Murphy. It was one of her best known tragic roles.

The painting was displayed at the Exhibition of 1765 held by the Society of Artists at Spring Gardens in London. Today it is in the collection of the Tate Britain, having been acquired by the gallery in 1982.

== Bibliography ==
- De Bruijn, Emile. Borrowed Landscapes: China and Japan in the Historic Houses and Gardens of Britain and Ireland. Bloomsbury, 2023.
- Thorpe, Ashley. Performing China on the London Stage: Chinese Opera and Global Power, 1759–2008. Palgrave Macmillan, 2016.
