= Tilly Kettle =

English painter (1735–1786)

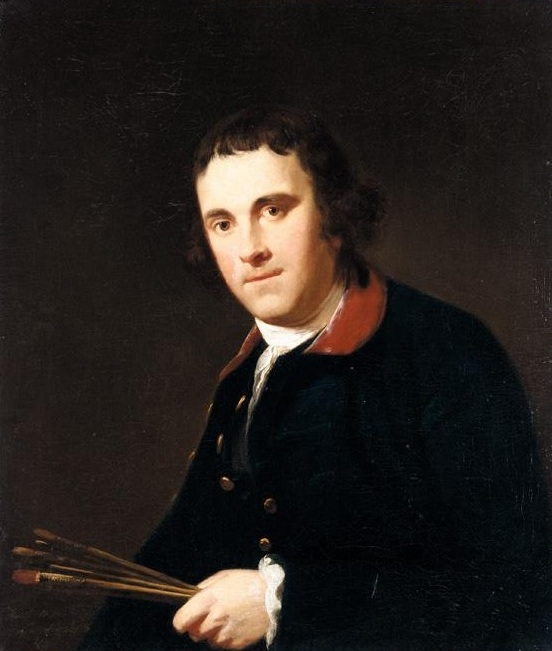
Self-portrait of Kettle, 1762

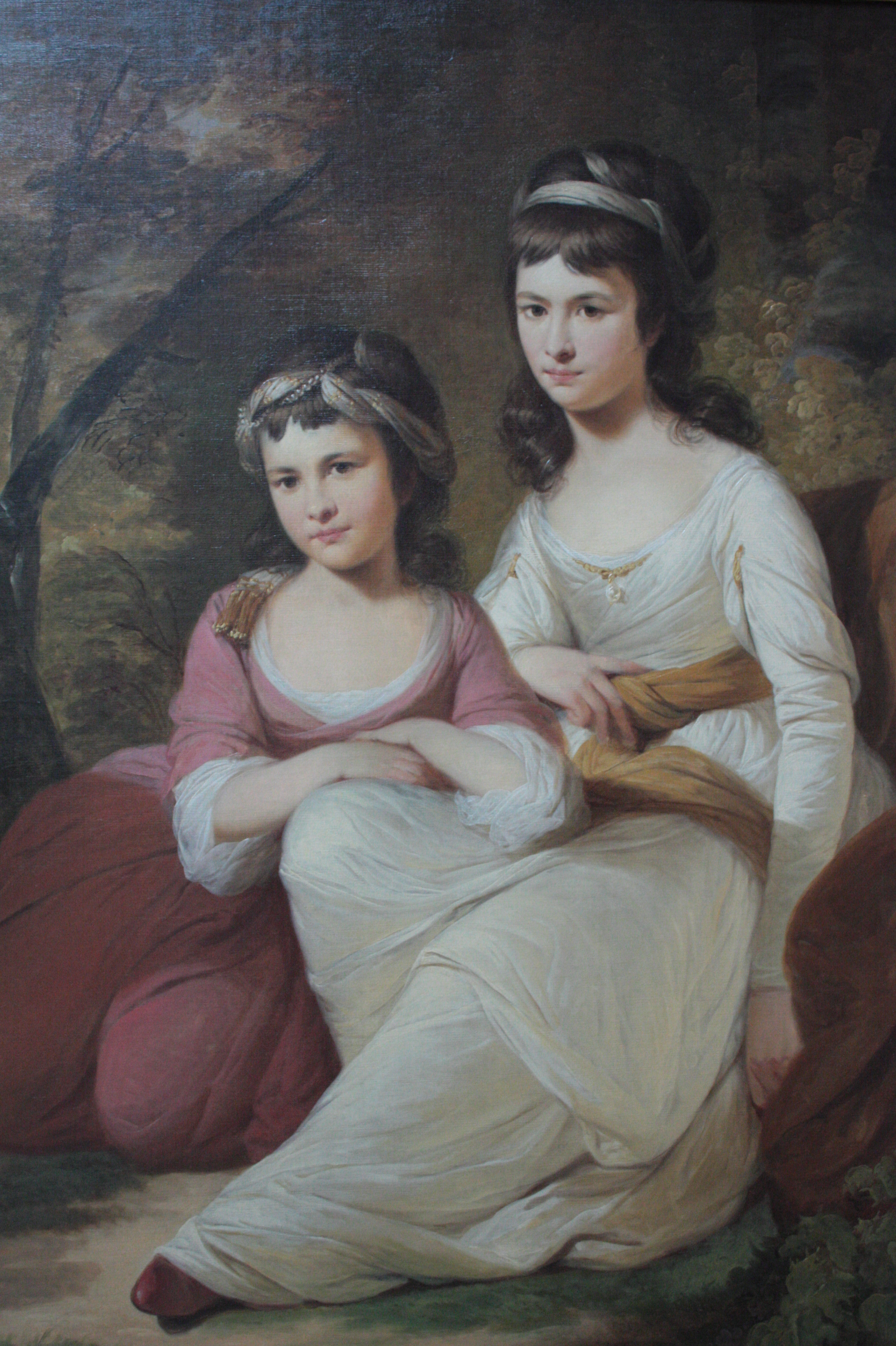
Eliza and Mary Davidson by Tilly Kettle, painted in India, 1784 (detail)

Tilly Kettle (1735 – 1786) was an English painter who specialised in portrait painting. He was the first British painter to operate in Colonial India.

== Life ==
He was born in London, the son of a coach painter, in a family that had been members of the Brewers' Company of freemen for five generations. He studied drawing with William Shipley in the Strand and first entered professional portraiture in the 1750s.

Kettle's first series of portraits appeared in the 1760s. His first surviving painting is a self-portrait from 1760, with his first exhibit with (A. Graves, 1907) the Free Society of Artists in 1761. In 1762, he worked at restoring Robert Streater's ceiling paintings in the Sheldonian Theatre, Oxford, and painted Francis Yarborough, a doctor of Brasenose College, Oxford in 1763. He painted many members of the family of William Legge, 2nd Earl of Dartmouth. In 1764–5, he was active in London and continued exhibiting at the Society of Artists. At the Exhibition of 1765 he displayed Mary Ann Yates as Mandane.

In 1768, Kettle sailed to India with the British East India Company, landing at Madras (now Chennai), where he remained for two years. There, he painted Lord Pigot and Muhammad Ali Khan twice (once alone and once with five of his sons). He also painted non-portraits, including Dancing Girls (Blacks) in 1772 and a suttee scene in 1776 entitled, The ceremony of a gentoo woman taking leave of her relations and distributing her jewels prior to ascending the funeral pyre of her deceased husband. In 1770 Kettle painted a half-length portrait of 'Sir' Levett Hanson, a peripatetic writer on European knighthood and chivalry originally from Yorkshire. (The portrait is now in the collection of the Bury St Edmunds Manor House Museum.) In 1768, Kettle also painted a group portrait of Sir Samuel Cornish, 1st Baronet, Richard Kempenfelt and Thomas Parry. In Autumn 2022, the painting went on permanent display at Queen's House in Greenwich, having been acquired by the National Maritime Museum, with assistance from the Society for Nautical Research.

Kettle moved on to Calcutta (now Kolkata) in 1771 and painted Shuja ud-Daula and Dancing-Girl Holding the Stem of a Hookah. In 1775, he painted George Bogle, Warren Hastings' emissary to Tibet, in Tibetan dress, presenting a ceremonial white scarf to Lobsang Palden Yeshe the 6th Panchen Lama. He also took an Indian bibi or mistress (whose name isn't recorded) and had two daughters by her, Ann (baptised 22 February 1773 in Calcutta) and Elizabeth (30 April 1774 in Calcutta).

He left India in 1776 for London, traveling on the ship Talbot. On his return, he swiftly married Mary "Polly" Paine (1753–1798) on 23 February 1777. Mary was the younger daughter of the architect James Paine and half sister of the sculptor James Paine. She brought a dowry of £5,000, while Kettle put up £3,000 toward a trust fund, set up in a pre-nuptial settlement, dated 22 February 1777, the day before their wedding, so both parties were well established. The couple had two children, a daughter, Mary, and a son, James (November 1782 – 1819) who joined the Madras Army in 1810, became a captain, took an Indian bibi, had a daughter in 1814 and died in 1819.

Contemporaries indicated that Kettle may have been manipulated into the marriage for financial reasons. At the same time, he switched his exhibitors to the Royal Academy of Art. He had fewer clients in England than he had before his departure, and contemporaries claimed his wife was financially imprudent. He fell into debt, and spent some time in Ireland to escape his financial problems.

On 9 June 1786 Kettle made his will, giving his address as Brussels, rather than London, possibly to confuse his creditors. In 1786 he set out for a return to India. He attempted the voyage overland through Asia. His last portrait, The Turkish Janissary of the English Factory, Aleppo, was painted in Aleppo, and he died some time later, although where and when is unclear, possibly in the desert on his way to Basrah before the end of 1786. His will was registered at the British cancellaria in Aleppo on 5 July 1787.

== Gallery ==
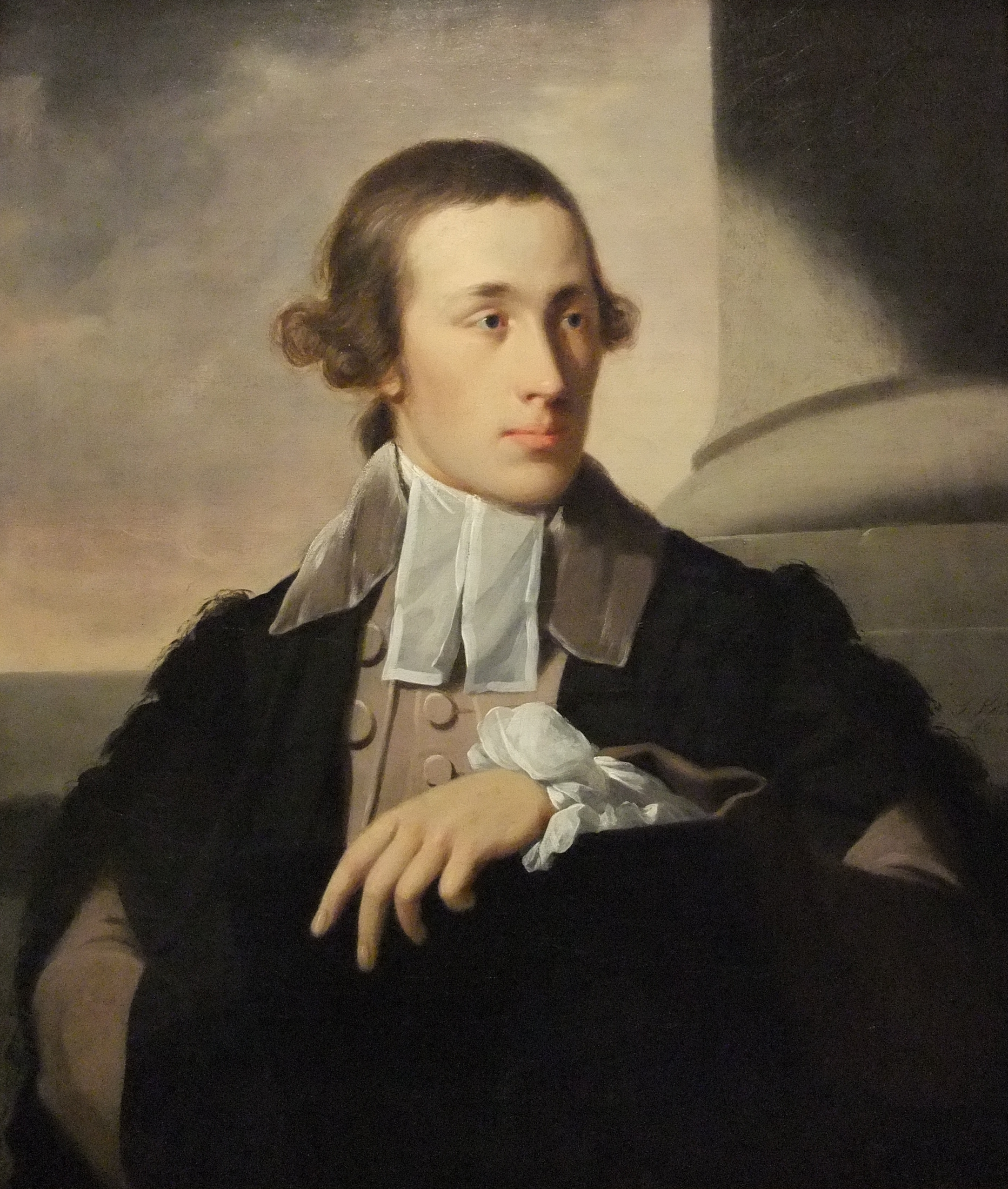
Brownlow North, 1763

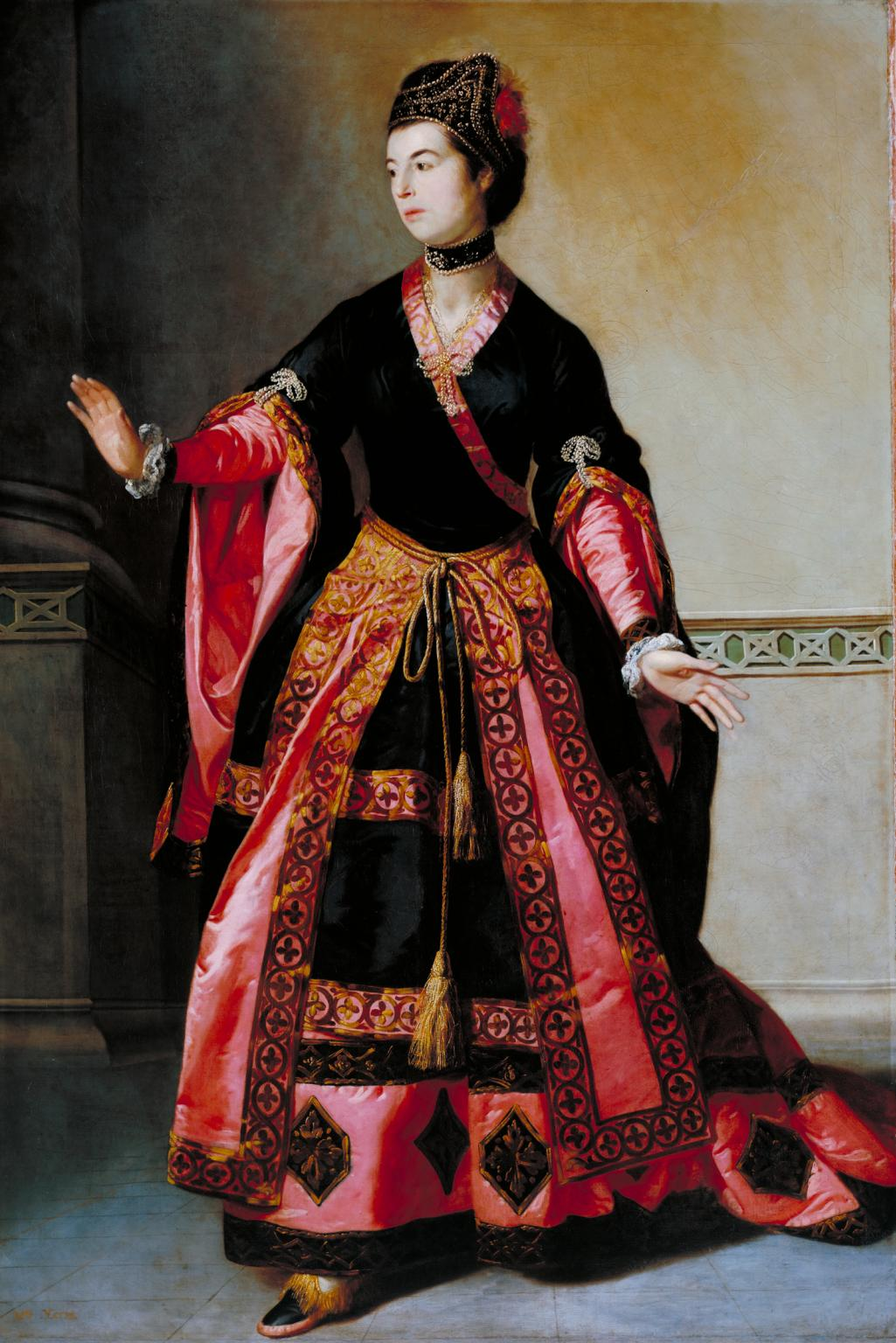
Mary Ann Yates as Mandane, 1765

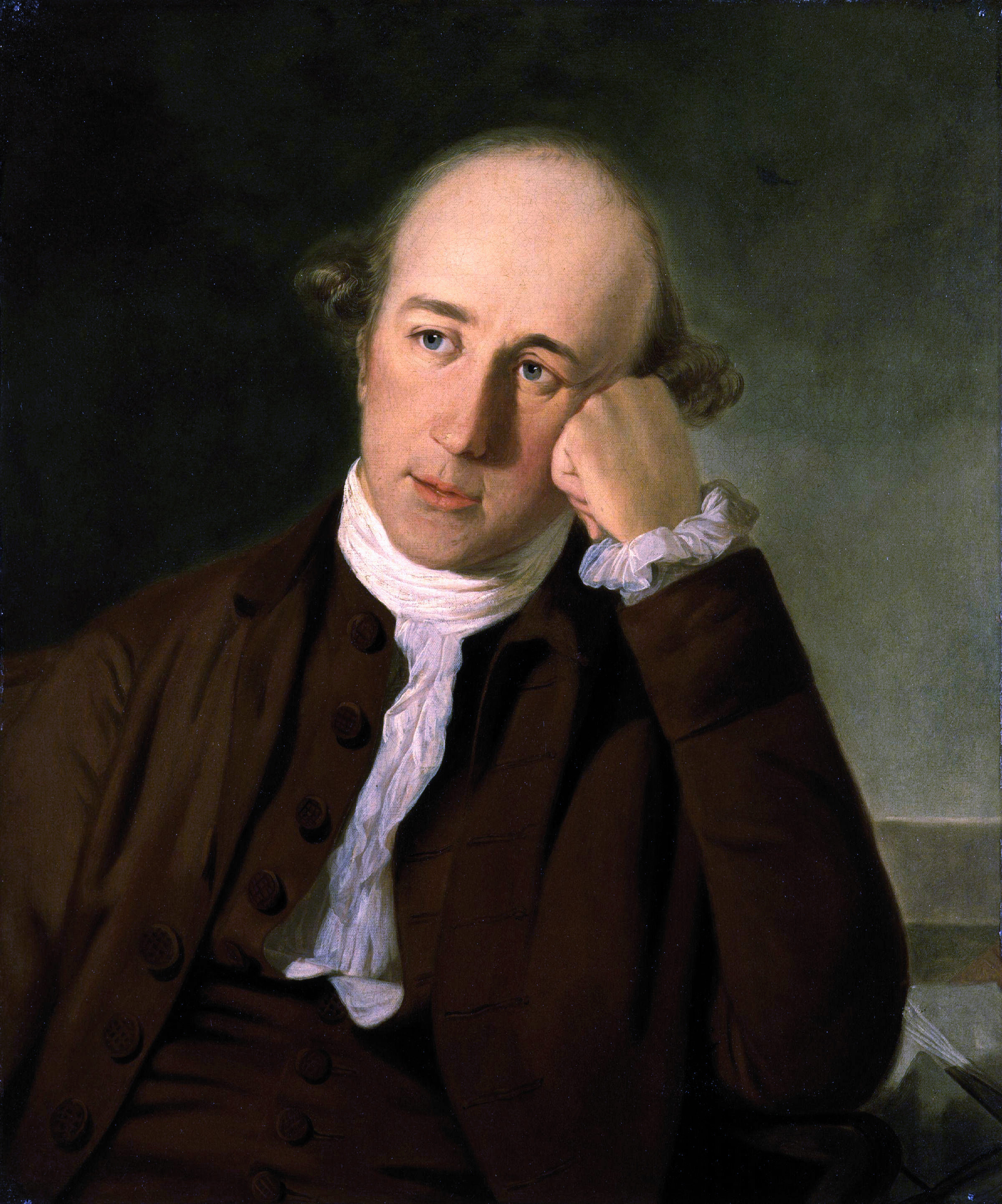
Warren Hastings, 1772

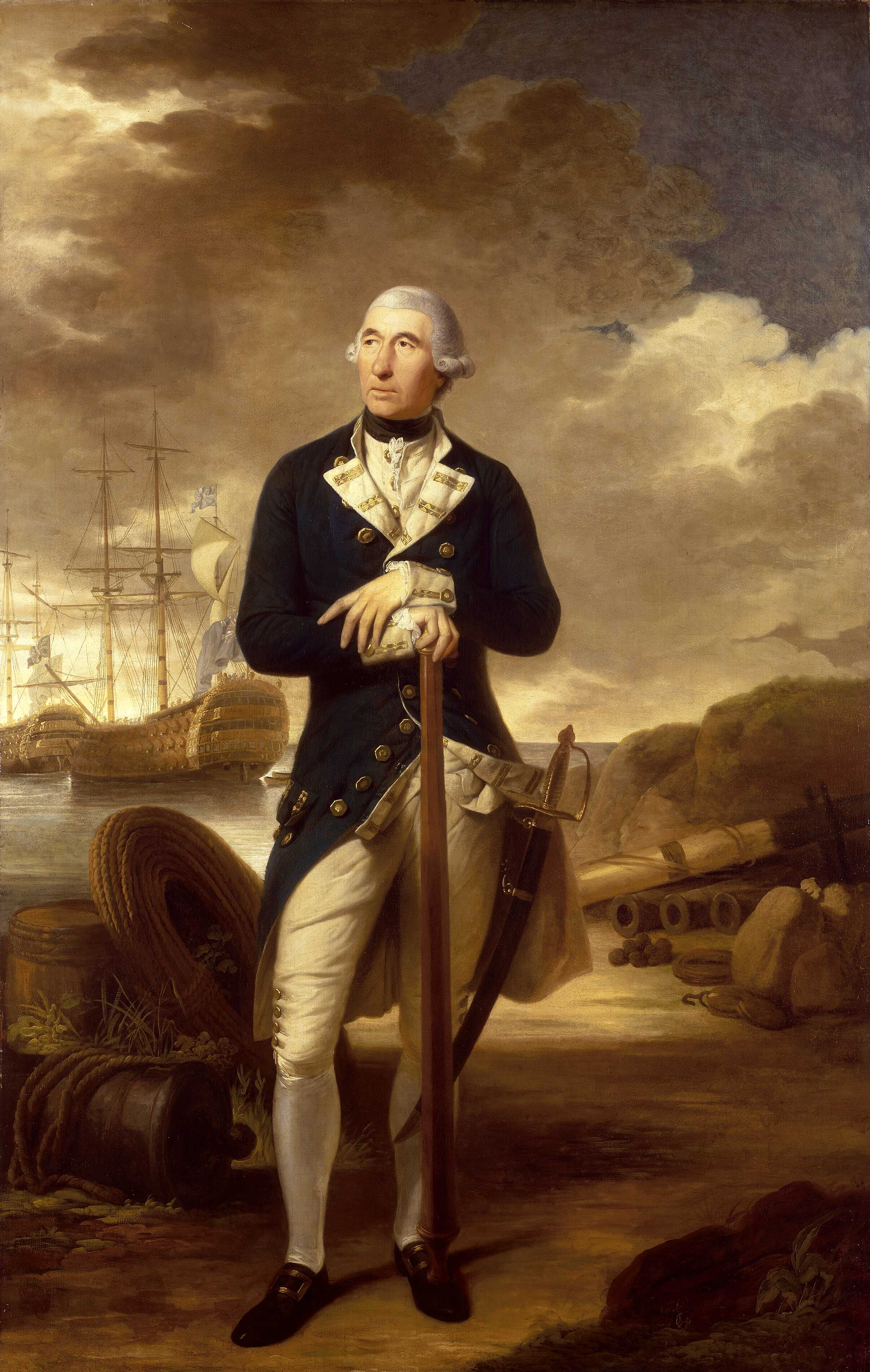
Richard Kempenfelt, 1782

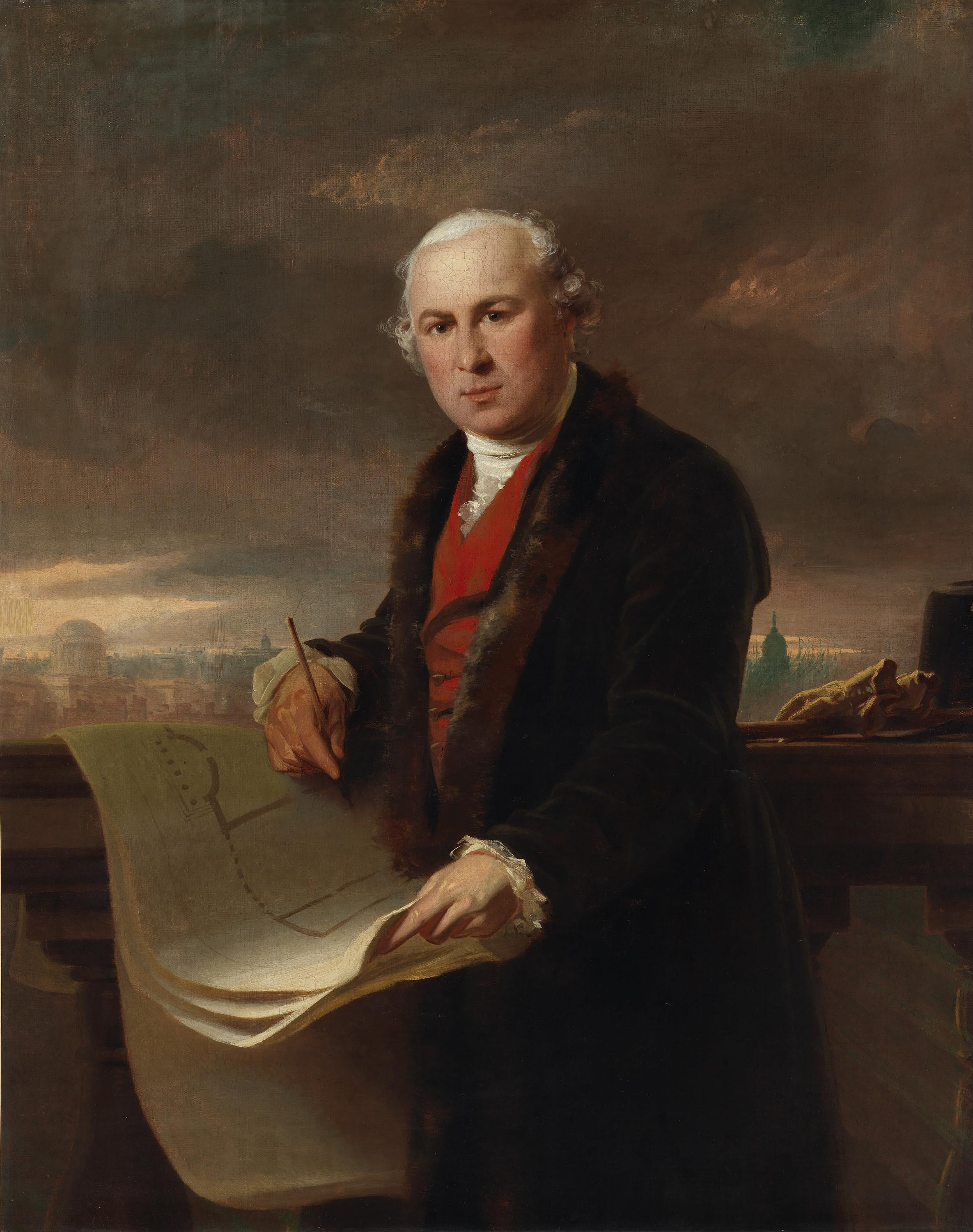
James Gandon, c.1783

== Collections ==
Kettle's works are held in the permanent collections of several international institutions, including the Tate, the National Portrait Gallery, London, the British Museum, the Yale Center for British Art, and the Royal Museums Greenwich.
