= Reveries of the Solitary Walker =

1778 unfinished book by Jean-Jacques Rousseau

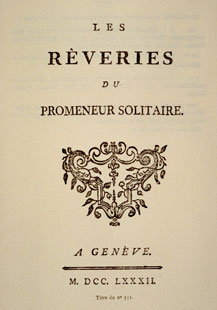
- Published in 1782.
- Author: Jean-Jacques Rousseau

The Reveries of the Solitary Walker (French: Les Rêveries du promeneur solitaire) is an unfinished book by Genevan philosopher Jean-Jacques Rousseau, written between 1776 and 1778. It was the last of a number of works composed toward the end of his life that were deeply autobiographical. Previous such works include The Confessions and Dialogues: Rousseau, Judge of Jean-Jacques.

The book is divided into ten chapters called "Walks" ("Promenades" in the original French). Walks One to Seven are complete, the Eighth and Ninth Walks were completed but not revised by Rousseau, while the Tenth Walk was incomplete at the author's death in 1778. The first publication was in 1782.

The content of the book is a mix of autobiographical anecdote, descriptions of the sights, especially plants, that Rousseau saw in his walks on the outskirts of Paris, and elaborations and extensions of arguments previously made by Rousseau in fields like education and political philosophy.

The work is in large parts marked by serenity and resignation, but also bears witness to Rousseau's awareness of the ill-effects of persecution towards the end of his life.

== Reception ==
The Reveries of the Solitary Walker (as it appears in Rousseau's original manuscript) has been described as the most beautiful book composed by Rousseau, comprising a series of exquisitely crafted essays. It has been argued that each of the ten walks in Rousseau's book has a unique musical tonality combined with internal variations. "He struck a new romantic note by suggesting that the meditative spirit may always find in nature something responsive to its mood." Before Rousseau's book the word "reverie" had a negative connotation: a 1771 dictionary defined the word as "ridiculous imagination" or "anxieties and cares that preoccupy the mind." Through his book, Rousseau helped create a positive connotation for the word by reveling in experiences that circumvented conscious thought.
