= Rousseau on Women, Love, and Family =

Rousseau on Women, Love, and Family is an anthology of works by French philosopher Jean-Jacques Rousseau which covers themes of women, their inclusion in politics, gender identity, love, and family. The volume was edited by authors Christopher Kelly and Eve Grace. It includes four passages from Rousseau's Emile, and excerpts from his writings in Letter to d'Alembert, Levite of Ephraim and Émile et Sophie. Two of the letters to "Henriette" were translated for the first time by the editors for inclusion in this volume.
