= Jean-Jacques Rousseau =

Genevan philosopher (1712–1778)

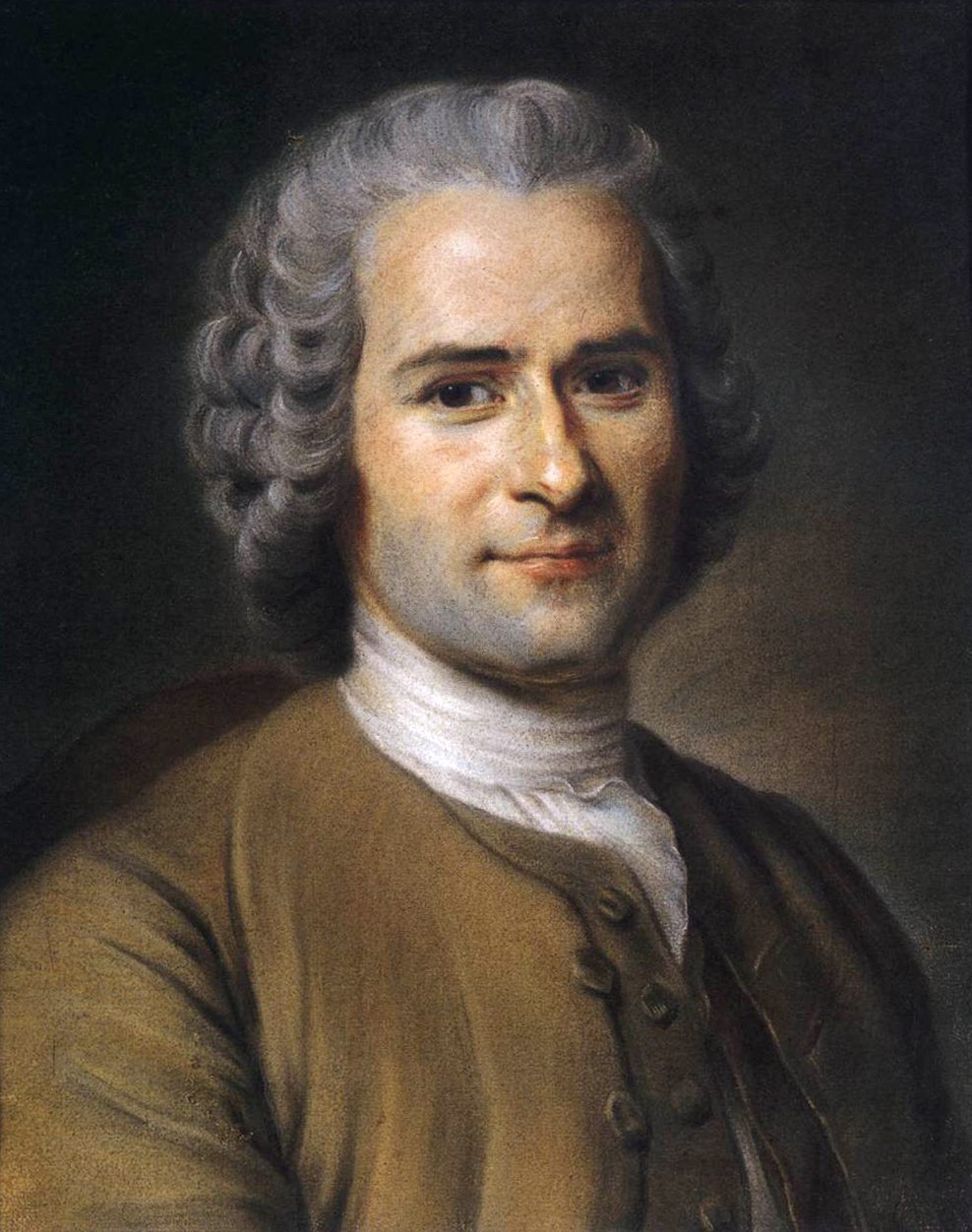
- Portrait, c. 1753
- Born: 28 June 1712; Republic of Geneva
- Died: 2 July 1778 (aged 66); Ermenonville, Picardy, France
- Partner: Thérèse Levasseur (1745–1778)
- Children: 5

Philosophical work
- Era: Age of Enlightenment (early modern philosophy)
- Region: Western philosophy
- School: Enlightenment French philosophy; social contract; Sentimentalism; precursor of Romanticism
- Main interests: Political philosophy, music, education, literature
- Notable ideas: General will, amour de soi, amour-propre, moral simplicity of humanity, child-centered learning, civil religion, popular sovereignty, positive liberty, public opinion
- Writing career
- Language: French
- Years active: From 1743
- Genres: Fiction (sentimental novel; comedy; libretto; poetry); Non-fiction (treatise; essay; article; epistle; autobiography)
- Subject: Social change
- Notable works: The Social Contract; Julie, or the New Heloise
- Notable awards: Académie de Dijon (1750)
- Movement: Sentimentalism

Jean-Jacques Rousseau (UK: /ˈruːsoʊ/, US: /ruːˈsoʊ/; French: [ʒɑ̃ʒak ʁuso]; 28 June 1712 – 2 July 1778) was a Genevan philosophe, writer, and composer. His political philosophy was influential during the Age of Enlightenment, as well as during the French Revolution.

Rousseau wrote Discourse on Inequality, which argues that private property is the source of social inequality, and The Social Contract, which outlines his ideas for what makes a legitimate political order. Rousseau's sentimental novel Julie, or the New Heloise (1761) was an example of his contributions to preromanticism and romanticism in fiction. His Émile, or On Education (1762) is a treatise on the place of the individual in society. Rousseau also wrote some autobiographical writings, such as the posthumously published Confessions (completed in 1770), and the unfinished Reveries of the Solitary Walker (composed 1776–1778)—,which featured an increased focus on subjectivity and introspection. He is thought to be one of the influences on the late 18th-century "Age of Sensibility."

== Biography ==
=== Youth ===
Rousseau was born in the Republic of Geneva, which was at the time a city-state and a Protestant associate of the Swiss Confederacy, now a canton of Switzerland. Since 1536, Geneva had been a Huguenot republic and the seat of Calvinism. Five generations before Rousseau, his ancestor Didier, a bookseller who may have published Protestant tracts, had escaped persecution from French Catholics by fleeing to Geneva in 1549, where he became a wine merchant.

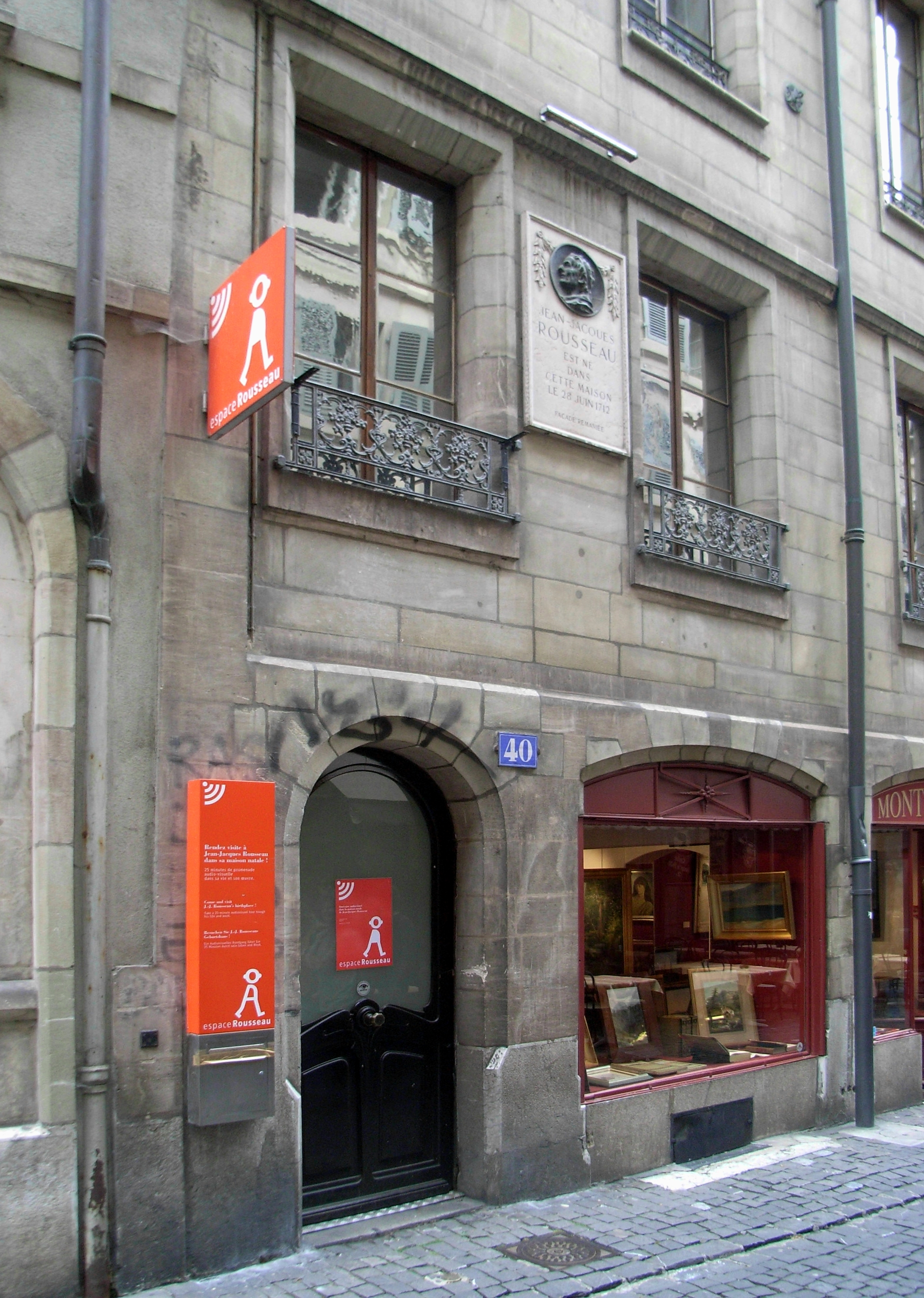
The house where Rousseau was born at number 40, Grand-Rue, Geneva

Rousseau was proud that his family, of the moyen order (or middle-class), had voting rights in the city. Throughout his life, he generally signed his books "Jean-Jacques Rousseau, Citizen of Geneva". Geneva, in theory, was governed democratically by its male voting citizens. The citizens were a minority of the population when compared to the immigrants (inhabitants) and their descendants (natives). In fact, rather than being run by vote of the citizens, the city was ruled by a small number of wealthy families that made up the Council of Two Hundred; they delegated their power to a 25-member executive group from among them called the "Small Council".

There was much political debate within Geneva, extending down to the tradespeople. Much discussion was held over the idea of the sovereignty of the people, of which the ruling class oligarchy was making a mockery. In 1707, democratic reformer Pierre Fatio protested this situation, saying "A sovereign that never performs an act of sovereignty is an imaginary being". He was shot by order of the Small Council. Jean-Jacques Rousseau's father, Isaac, was not in the city then, but Jean-Jacques's grandfather supported Fatio and was penalized for it.

Rousseau's father, Isaac Rousseau, followed his grandfather, father, and brothers into the watchmaking business. He also taught dance for a brief period. Isaac, notwithstanding his artisan status, was well-educated and a lover of music. Rousseau wrote that "A Genevan watchmaker is a man who can be introduced anywhere; a Parisian watchmaker is only fit to talk about watches". (Note: "And indeed, a British visitor commented, 'Even the lower class of people [of Geneva] are exceedingly well informed, and there is perhaps no city in Europe where learning is more universally diffused'; another at mid-century noticed that Genevan workmen were fond of reading the works of Locke and Montesquieu." —Leo Damrosch)

In 1699, Isaac ran into political difficulty by entering a quarrel with visiting English officers, who in response drew their swords and threatened him. After local officials stepped in, it was Isaac who was punished, as Geneva was concerned with maintaining its ties to foreign powers.

Rousseau's mother, Suzanne Bernard Rousseau, was from an upper-class family. She was raised by her uncle Samuel Bernard, a Calvinist preacher. He cared for Suzanne after her father, Jacques, who had run into trouble with the legal and religious authorities for fornication and having a mistress, died in his early 30s. In 1695, Suzanne had to answer charges that she had attended a street theatre disguised as a peasant woman so she could gaze upon M. Vincent Sarrasin, whom she fancied despite his continuing marriage. After a hearing, she was ordered by the Genevan Consistory to never interact with him again.

She married Rousseau's father at the age of 31. Isaac's sister had married Suzanne's brother eight years earlier, after she had become pregnant and they had been chastised by the Consistory. The child died at birth. The young Rousseau was told a fabricated story about the situation in which young love had been denied by a disapproving patriarch but later prevailed, resulting in two marriages uniting the families on the same day. Rousseau never learnt the truth.

Rousseau was born on 28 June 1712, and he later related: "I was born almost dying, they had little hope of saving me". He was baptized on 4 July 1712, in the great cathedral. His mother died of puerperal fever nine days after his birth, which he later described as "the first of my misfortunes".

He and his older brother François were brought up by their father and a paternal aunt, also named Suzanne. When Rousseau was five, his father sold the house the family had received from his mother's relatives. While the idea was that his sons would inherit the principal when grown up and he would live off the interest in the meantime, in the end, the father took most of the substantial proceeds. With the selling of the house, the Rousseau family moved out of the upper-class neighbourhood and into an apartment house in a neighbourhood of craftsmen—silversmiths, engravers, and other watchmakers. Growing up around craftsmen, Rousseau would later contrast them favourably to those who produced more aesthetic works, writing "those important persons who are called artists rather than artisans, work solely for the idle and rich, and put an arbitrary price on their baubles". Rousseau was also exposed to class politics in this environment, as the artisans often agitated in a campaign of resistance against the privileged class running Geneva.

Rousseau had no recollection of learning to read, but he remembered how when he was five or six his father encouraged his love of reading:

Every night, after supper, we read some part of a small collection of romances [adventure stories], which had been my mother's. My father's design was only to improve my reading, and he thought these entertaining works were calculated to give me a fondness for it; but we soon found ourselves so interested in the adventures they contained, that we alternately read whole nights together and could not bear to give over until after a volume. Sometimes, in the morning, on hearing the swallows at our window, my father, quite ashamed of this weakness, would cry, "Come, come, let us go to bed; I am more a child than thou art." (Confessions, Book 1)

Rousseau's reading of escapist stories (such as L'Astrée by Honoré d'Urfé) affected him; he later wrote that they "gave me bizarre and romantic notions of human life, which experience and reflection have never been able to cure me of". After they had finished reading the novels, they began to read a collection of ancient and modern classics left by his mother's uncle. Of these, his favourite was Plutarch's Lives of the Noble Greeks and Romans, which he would read to his father while he made watches. Rousseau saw Plutarch's work as another kind of novel—the noble actions of heroes—and he would act out the deeds of the characters he was reading about. In his Confessions, Rousseau stated that the reading of Plutarch's works and "the conversations between my father and myself to which it gave rise, formed in me the free and republican spirit".

Witnessing the local townsfolk participate in militias made a big impression on Rousseau. Throughout his life, he would recall one scene where, after the volunteer militia had finished its manoeuvres, they began to dance around a fountain and most of the people from neighbouring buildings came out to join them, including him and his father. Rousseau would always see militias as the embodiment of popular spirit in opposition to the armies of the rulers, whom he saw as disgraceful mercenaries.

When Rousseau was ten, his father, an avid hunter, got into a legal quarrel with a wealthy landowner on whose lands he had been caught trespassing. To avoid certain defeat in the courts, he moved away to Nyon in the territory of Bern, taking Rousseau's aunt Suzanne with him. He remarried, and from that point, Jean-Jacques saw little of him. Jean-Jacques was left with his maternal uncle, who packed him and his son, Abraham Bernard, away to board for two years with a Calvinist minister in a hamlet outside Geneva. Here, the boys picked up the elements of mathematics and drawing. Rousseau, who was always deeply moved by religious services, for a time even dreamed of becoming a Protestant minister.

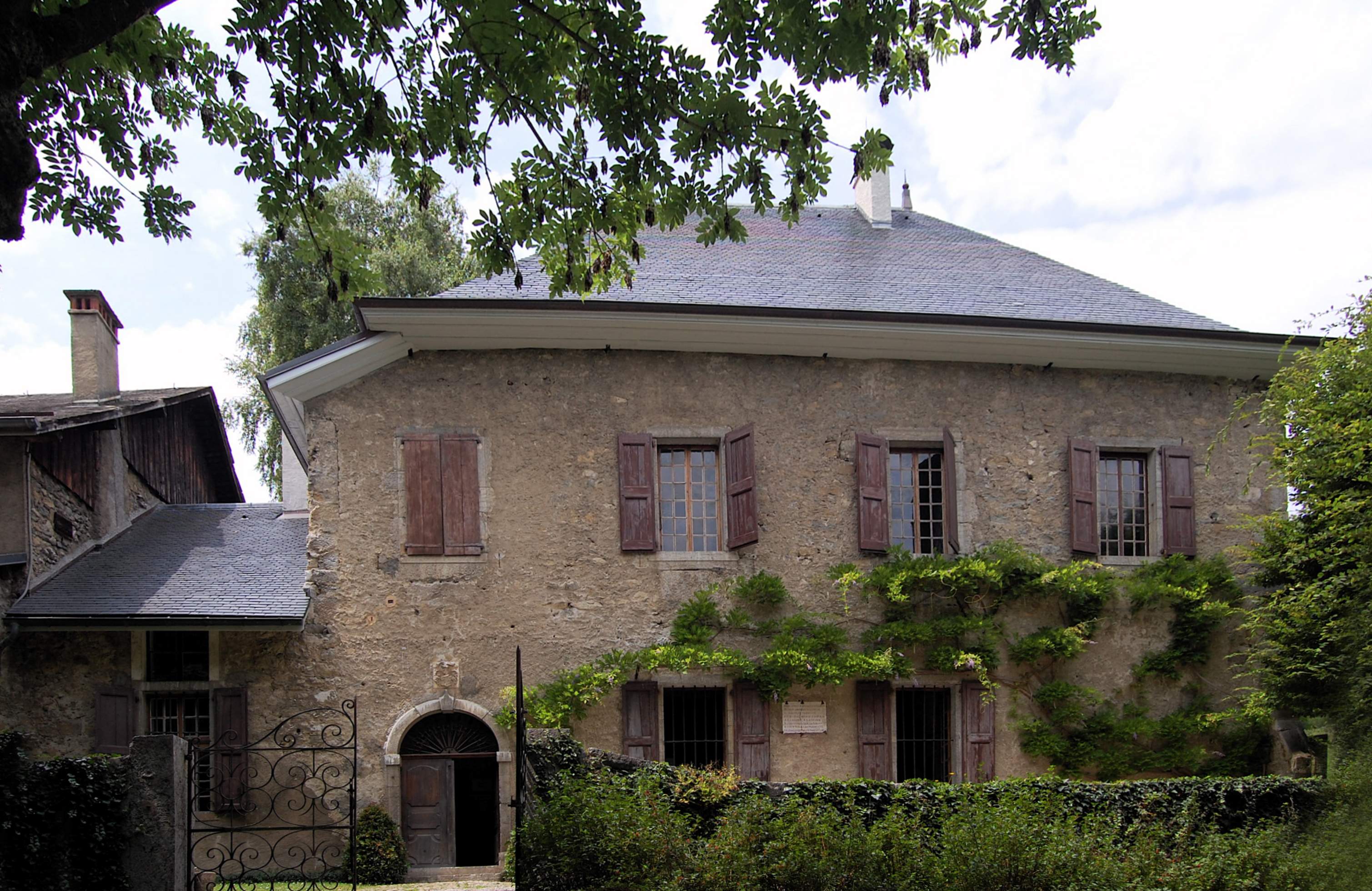
Les Charmettes, where Rousseau lived with Françoise-Louise de Warens from 1735 to 1736, now a museum dedicated to Rousseau

Virtually all information about Rousseau's youth has come from his posthumously published Confessions, in which the chronology is somewhat confused, though recent scholars have combed the archives for confirming evidence to fill in the blanks. At age 13, Rousseau was apprenticed first to a notary and then to an engraver who beat him. At 15, he ran away from Geneva (on 14 March 1728) after returning to the city and finding the city gates locked due to the curfew.

In adjoining Savoy he took shelter with a Roman Catholic priest, who introduced him to Françoise-Louise de Warens, age 29. She was a noblewoman of a Protestant background who was separated from her husband. As a professional lay proselytizer, she was paid by the King of Piedmont to help bring Protestants to Catholicism. They sent the boy to Turin, the capital of Savoy (which included Piedmont, in what is now Italy), to complete his conversion. This resulted in his having to give up his Genevan citizenship, although he would later revert to Calvinism to regain it.

In converting to Catholicism, both de Warens and Rousseau were likely reacting to Calvinism's insistence on the total depravity of man. Leo Damrosch writes: "An eighteenth-century Genevan liturgy still required believers to declare 'that we are miserable sinners, born in corruption, inclined to evil, incapable by ourselves of doing good'". De Warens, a deist by inclination, was attracted to Catholicism's doctrine of forgiveness of sins.

Finding himself on his own, since his father and uncle had more or less disowned him, the teenage Rousseau supported himself for a time as a servant, secretary, and tutor, wandering in Italy (Piedmont and Savoy) and France. Among his students was Stéphanie Louise de Bourbon-Conti. During this time, he lived on and off with de Warens, whom he idolized. Maurice Cranston notes, "Madame de Warens [...] took him into her household and mothered him; he called her 'maman' and she called him 'petit.'" Flattered by his devotion, de Warens tried to get him started in a profession, and arranged formal music lessons for him. At one point, he briefly attended a seminary with the idea of becoming a priest.

=== Early adulthood ===
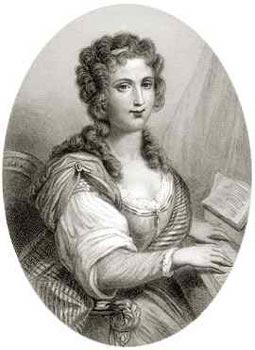
Françoise-Louise de Warens

When Rousseau reached 20, de Warens took him as her lover, while intimate also with the steward of her house. The sexual aspect of their relationship (a ménage à trois) confused Rousseau and made him uncomfortable, but he always considered de Warens the greatest love of his life. A rather profligate spender, she had a large library and loved to entertain and listen to music. She and her circle, comprising educated members of the Catholic clergy, introduced Rousseau to the world of letters and ideas. Rousseau had been an indifferent student, but during his 20s, which were marked by long bouts of hypochondria, he applied himself in earnest to the study of philosophy, mathematics, and music. At 25, he came into a small inheritance from his mother and used a portion of it to repay de Warens for her financial support of him. At 27, he took a job as a tutor in Lyon.

In 1742, Rousseau moved to Paris to present the Académie des Sciences with a new system of numbered musical notation he believed would make his fortune. His system, intended to be compatible with typography, is based on a single line, displaying numbers representing intervals between notes and dots and commas indicating rhythmic values. Believing the system was impractical, the academy rejected it, though they praised his mastery of the subject, and urged him to try again. He befriended Denis Diderot that year, connecting over the discussion of literary endeavors.

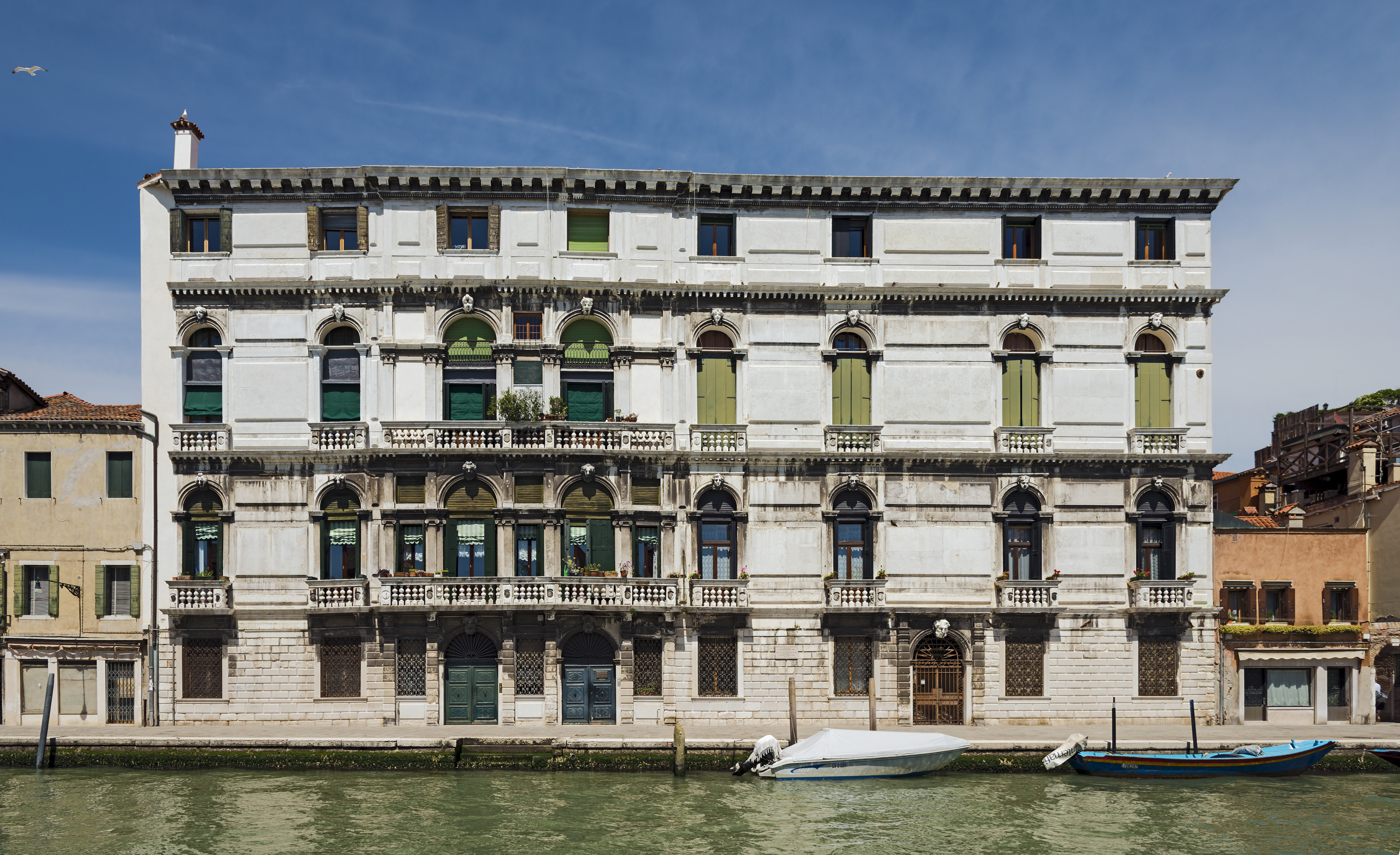
Palazzo Surian Bellotto belonging to Tommaso Querini at 968 Cannaregio Venice that served as the French Embassy during Rousseau's period as Secretary to the Ambassador

From 1743 to 1744, Rousseau had an honorable but ill-paying post as a secretary to the Comte de Montaigue, the French ambassador to Venice. This awoke in him a lifelong love for Italian music, particularly opera:

I had brought with me from Paris the prejudice of that city against Italian music; but I had also received from nature a sensibility and niceness of distinction which prejudice cannot withstand. I soon contracted that passion for Italian music with which it inspires all those who are capable of feeling its excellence. In listening to barcaroles, I found I had not yet known what singing was...

— Confessions

Rousseau's employer routinely received his stipend as much as a year late and paid his staff irregularly. After 11 months, Rousseau quit, taking from the experience a profound distrust of government bureaucracy.

=== Return to Paris ===
Returning to Paris, the penniless Rousseau befriended and became the lover of Thérèse Levasseur, a seamstress who was the sole support of her mother and numerous misbehaving siblings. At first, they did not live together, though later Rousseau took Thérèse and her mother in to live with him as his servants, and himself assumed the burden of supporting her large family. According to his Confessions, before she moved in with him, Thérèse bore him a son and as many as four other children (there is no independent verification for this number). (Note: Some of Rousseau's contemporaries believed the babies were not his. George Sand has written an essay, "Les Charmettes" (1865. Printed in the same volume as "Laura" from the same year), in which she explains why Rousseau may have accused himself falsely. She quotes her grandmother, in whose family Rousseau had been a tutor, and who stated that Rousseau could not have children.)

Rousseau wrote that he persuaded Thérèse to give each of the newborns up to a foundling hospital, for the sake of her "honor". "Her mother, who feared the inconvenience of a brat, came to my aid, and she [Thérèse] allowed herself to be overcome" (Confessions). In his letter to Madame de Francueil in 1751, he first pretended that he was not rich enough to raise his children, but in Book IX of the Confessions he gave the true reasons of his choice: "I trembled at the thought of intrusting them to a family ill brought up, to be still worse educated. The risk of the education of the foundling hospital was much less".

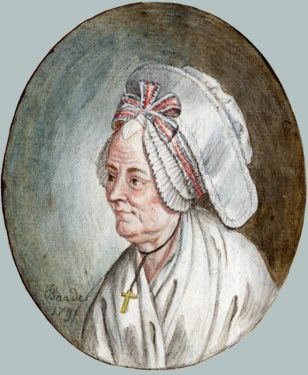
A portrait of Thérèse Levasseur from 1791

Ten years later, Rousseau made inquiries about the fate of his son, but unfortunately no record could be found. When Rousseau subsequently became celebrated as a theorist of education and child-rearing, his abandonment of his children was used by his critics, including Voltaire and Edmund Burke, as the basis for arguments ad hominem.

Beginning with some articles on music in 1749, (Note: Rousseau in his musical articles in the Encyclopédie engaged in lively controversy with other musicians, e.g. with Rameau, as in his article on Temperament, for which see Encyclopédie: Tempérament (English translation), also Temperament Ordinaire.) Rousseau contributed numerous articles to Diderot and D'Alembert's great Encyclopédie, the most famous of which was an article on political economy written in 1755.

Rousseau's ideas were the result of an almost obsessive dialogue with writers of the past, filtered in many cases through conversations with Diderot. In 1749, Rousseau was paying daily visits to Diderot, who had been thrown into the fortress of Vincennes under a lettre de cachet for opinions in his "Lettre sur les aveugles", that hinted at materialism, a belief in atoms, and natural selection. According to science historian Conway Zirkle, Rousseau saw the concept of natural selection "as an agent for improving the human species."

Rousseau had read about an essay competition sponsored by the Académie de Dijon to be published in the Mercure de France on the theme of whether the development of the arts and sciences had been morally beneficial. He wrote that while walking to Vincennes (about three miles from Paris), he had a revelation that the arts and sciences were responsible for the moral degeneration of humankind, who were basically good by nature. Rousseau's 1750 Discourse on the Arts and Sciences was awarded the first prize and gained him significant fame.

Rousseau continued his interest in music. He wrote both the words and music of his opera Le devin du village (The Village Soothsayer), which was performed for King Louis XV in 1752. The king was so pleased by the work that he offered Rousseau a lifelong pension. To the exasperation of his friends, Rousseau turned down the great honor, bringing him notoriety as "the man who had refused a king's pension". He also turned down several other advantageous offers, sometimes with a brusqueness bordering on truculence that gave offense and caused him problems. The same year, the visit of a troupe of Italian musicians to Paris, and their performance of Giovanni Battista Pergolesi's La serva padrona, prompted the Querelle des Bouffons, which pitted protagonists of French music against supporters of the Italian style. Rousseau, as noted above, was an enthusiastic supporter of the Italians against Jean-Philippe Rameau and others, making an important contribution with his Letter on French Music.

=== Return to Geneva ===
On returning to Geneva in 1754, Rousseau reconverted to Calvinism and regained his official Genevan citizenship. In 1755, Rousseau completed his second major work, the Discourse on the Origin and Basis of Inequality Among Men (the Discourse on Inequality), which elaborated on the arguments of the Discourse on the Arts and Sciences.

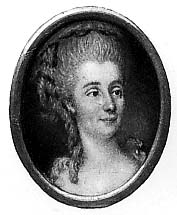
A contemporary portrait of the Countess of Houdetot

He also pursued an unconsummated romantic attachment with the 25-year-old Sophie d'Houdetot, which partly inspired his epistolary novel Julie, ou la nouvelle Héloïse (also based on memories of his idyllic youthful relationship with Mme de Warens). Sophie was the cousin and houseguest of Rousseau's patroness and landlady Madame d'Épinay, whom he treated rather high-handedly. He resented being at Mme. d'Épinay's beck and call and detested what he viewed as the insincere conversation and shallow atheism of the Encyclopédistes whom he met at her table. Wounded feelings gave rise to a bitter three-way quarrel between Rousseau and Madame d'Épinay; her lover, the journalist Grimm; and their mutual friend, Diderot, who took their side against Rousseau. Diderot later described Rousseau as being "false, vain as Satan, ungrateful, cruel, hypocritical, and wicked... He sucked ideas from me, used them himself, and then affected to despise me".

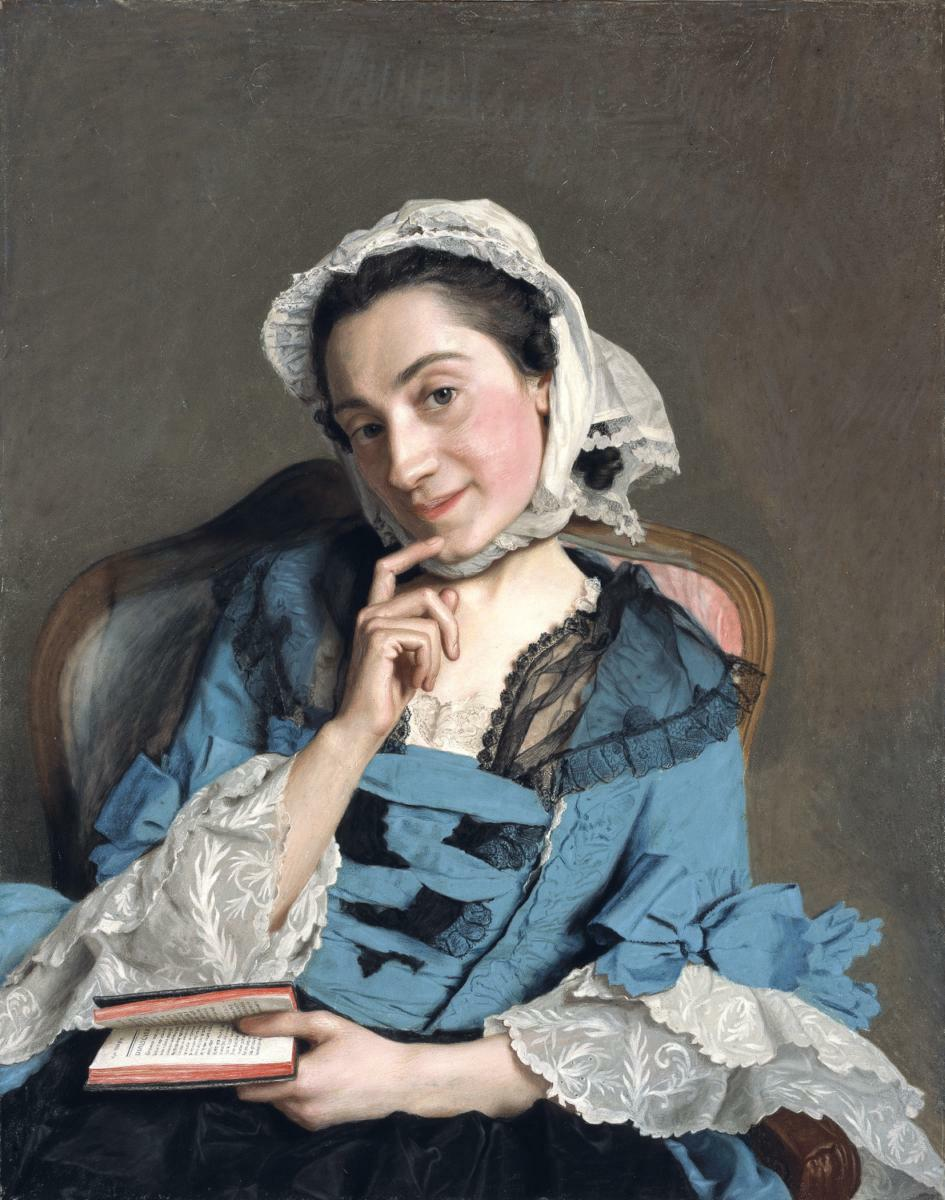
Mme d'Épinay by Jean-Étienne Liotard, ca 1759 (Musée d'art et d'histoire, Geneva)

Rousseau's break with the Encyclopédistes coincided with the composition of his three major works, in all of which he emphasized his fervent belief in a spiritual origin of man's soul and the universe, in contradistinction to the materialism of Diderot, La Mettrie and D'Holbach. During this period, Rousseau enjoyed the support and patronage of Charles II François Frédéric de Montmorency-Luxembourg and the Prince de Conti, two of the richest and most powerful nobles in France. These men truly liked Rousseau and enjoyed his ability to converse on any subject, but they also used him as a way of getting back at Louis XV and the political faction surrounding his mistress, Madame de Pompadour. Even with them, however, Rousseau went too far, courting rejection when he criticized the practice of tax farming, in which some of them engaged.

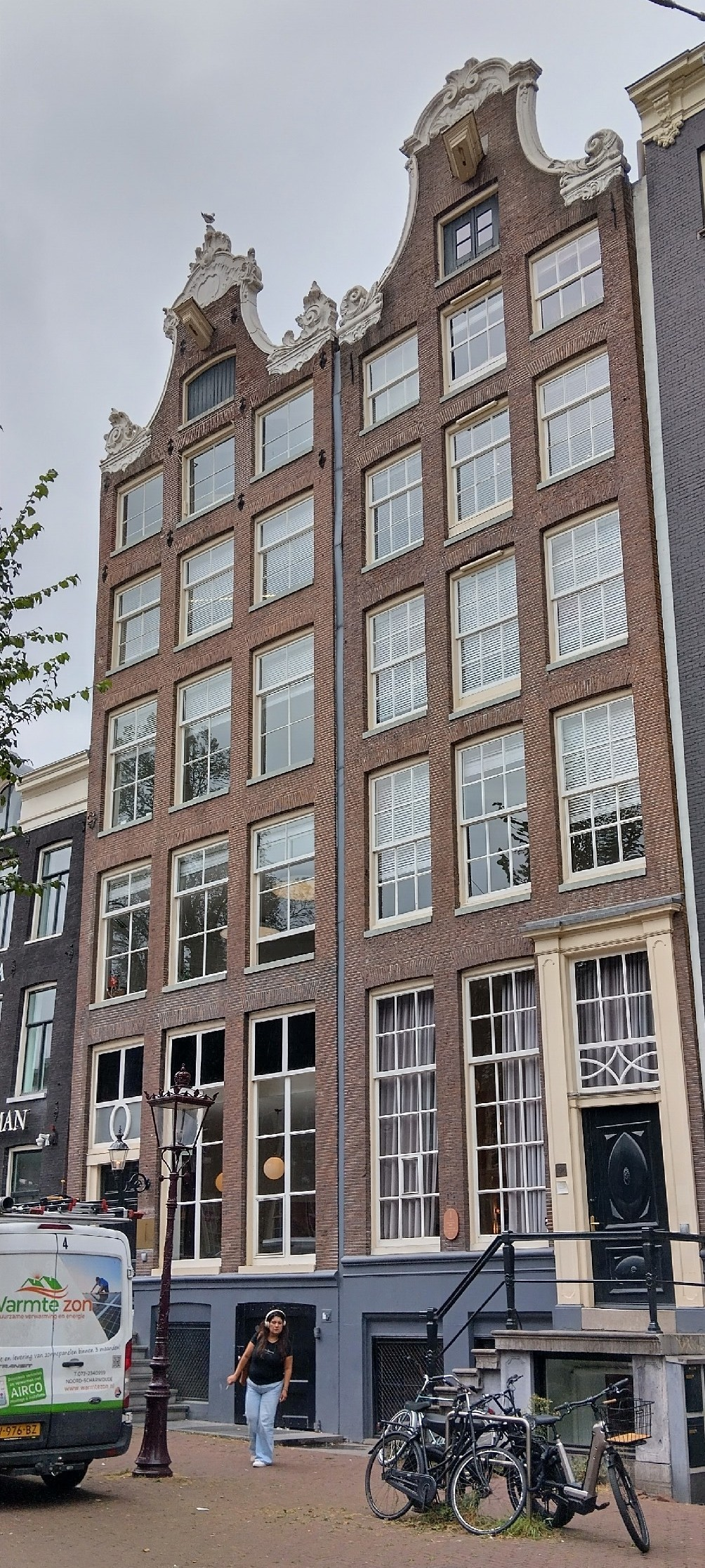
The house on the right NZ Voorburgwal 296, Amsterdam is where his principle publisher and friend Marc-Michel Rey lived and who urged Rousseau to put his memoirs in writing.

Rousseau's 800-page novel of sentiment, Julie, ou la nouvelle Héloïse, was published in 1761 to immense success. The book's rhapsodic descriptions of the natural beauty of the Swiss countryside struck a chord in the public and may have helped spark the subsequent nineteenth-century craze for Alpine scenery. In 1762, Rousseau published Du Contrat Social, Principes du droit politique (in English, literally Of the Social Contract, Principles of Political Right) in April. Even his friend Antoine-Jacques Roustan felt impelled to write a polite rebuttal of the chapter on Civil Religion in the Social Contract, which implied that the concept of a Christian republic was paradoxical since Christianity taught submission rather than participation in public affairs. Rousseau helped Roustan find a publisher for the rebuttal.

Rousseau published Émile, or On Education in May. A famous section of Émile, "The Profession of Faith of a Savoyard Vicar", was intended to be a defense of religious belief. Rousseau's choice of a Catholic vicar of humble peasant background (plausibly based on a kindly prelate he had met as a teenager) as a spokesman for the defense of religion was in itself a daring innovation for the time. The vicar's creed was that of Socinianism (or Unitarianism as it is called today). Because it rejected original sin and divine revelation, both Protestant and Catholic authorities took offense. (Note: Rousseau's biographer Leo Damrosch believes that the authorities chose to condemn him for Émile on religious grounds but not for his misogyny, but for The Social Contract he was condemned for both religious rather than political reasons.)

Moreover, Rousseau advocated the opinion that, insofar as they lead people to virtue, all religions are equally worthy, and that people should therefore conform to the religion in which they have been brought up. This religious indifferentism caused Rousseau and his books to be banned from France and Geneva. He was condemned from the pulpit by the Archbishop of Paris, his books were burned and warrants were issued for his arrest. Former friends such as Jacob Vernes of Geneva could not accept his views and wrote violent rebuttals.

A sympathetic observer, David Hume "professed no surprise when he learned that Rousseau's books were banned in Geneva and elsewhere". Rousseau, he wrote, "has not had the precaution to throw any veil over his sentiments; and, as he scorns to dissemble his contempt for established opinions, he could not wonder that all the zealots were in arms against him. The liberty of the press is not so secured in any country... as not to render such an open attack on popular prejudice somewhat dangerous."

=== Voltaire and Frederick the Great ===
After Rousseau's Émile had outraged the French parliament, an arrest order was issued by parliament against him, causing him to flee to Switzerland. Subsequently, when the Swiss authorities also proved unsympathetic to him—condemning both Émile, and also The Social Contract—Voltaire issued an invitation to Rousseau to come and reside with him, commenting that: "I shall always love the author of the 'Vicaire savoyard' whatever he has done, and whatever he may do...Let him come here [to Ferney]! He must come! I shall receive him with open arms. He shall be master here more than I. I shall treat him like my own son."

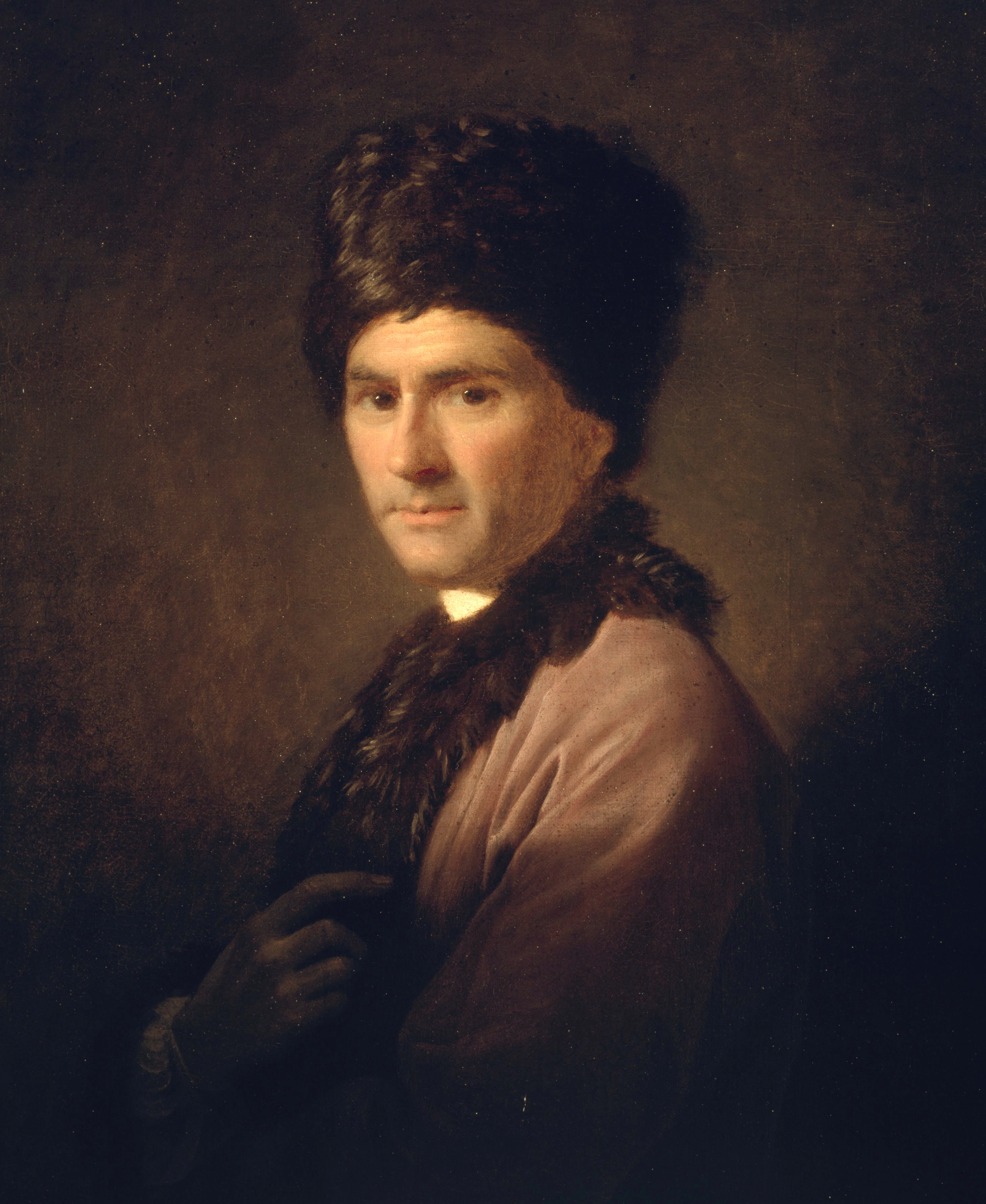
1766 portrait of Rousseau wearing an Armenian papakha and costume, Allan Ramsay

Rousseau later expressed regret that he had not replied to Voltaire's invitation. In July 1762, after Rousseau was informed that he could not continue to reside in Bern, D'Alembert advised him to move to the Principality of Neuchâtel, ruled by Frederick the Great of Prussia. Subsequently, Rousseau accepted an invitation to reside in Môtiers, fifteen miles from Neuchâtel. On 11 July 1762, Rousseau wrote to Frederick, describing how he had been driven from France, from Geneva, and from Bern; and seeking Frederick's protection. He also mentioned that he had criticized Frederick in the past and would continue to be critical of Frederick in the future, stating however: "Your Majesty may dispose of me as you like." Frederick, still in the middle of the Seven Years' War, then wrote to the local governor of Neuchâtel, Marischal Keith, who was a mutual friend of theirs:

We must succor this poor unfortunate. His only offense is to have strange opinions which he thinks are good ones. I will send a hundred crowns, from which you will be kind enough to give him as much as he needs. I think he will accept them in kind more readily than in cash. If we were not at war, if we were not ruined, I would build him a hermitage with a garden, where he could live as I believe our first fathers did...I think poor Rousseau has missed his vocation; he was obviously born to be a famous anchorite, a desert father, celebrated for his austerities and flagellations...I conclude that the morals of your savage are as pure as his mind is illogical.

Rousseau, touched by the help he received from Frederick, stated that from then onwards he took a keen interest in Frederick's activities. As the Seven Years' War was about to end, Rousseau wrote to Frederick again, thanking him for the help received and urging him to put an end to military activities and to endeavor to keep his subjects happy instead. Frederick made no known reply but commented to Keith that Rousseau had given him a "scolding".

=== Fugitive ===
For more than two years (1762–1765) Rousseau lived at Môtiers, spending his time in reading and writing and meeting visitors such as James Boswell (December 1764). (Boswell recorded his private discussions with Rousseau, in both direct quotation and dramatic dialog, over several pages of his 1764 journal.) As a pastime, he took up the local tradition of bobbin lace making. In the meantime, the local ministers had become aware of the apostasies in some of his writings and resolved not to let him stay in the vicinity. The Neuchâtel Consistory summoned Rousseau to answer a charge of blasphemy. He wrote back asking to be excused due to his inability to sit for a long time due to his ailment.

Rousseau's own pastor, Frédéric-Guillaume de Montmollin, started denouncing him publicly as an Antichrist. In one inflammatory sermon, Montmollin quoted Proverbs 15:8: "The sacrifice of the wicked is an abomination to the Lord, but the prayer of the upright is his delight"; this was interpreted by everyone to mean that Rousseau's taking communion was detested by the Lord.

The ecclesiastical attacks inflamed the parishioners, who proceeded to pelt Rousseau with stones when he would go out for walks. Around midnight of 6–7 September 1765, stones were thrown at the house Rousseau was staying in, and some glass windows were shattered. When a local official, Martinet, arrived at Rousseau's residence he saw so many stones on the balcony that he exclaimed "My God, it's a quarry!" At this point, Rousseau's friends in Môtiers advised him to leave the town.

Since he wanted to remain in Switzerland, Rousseau decided to accept an offer to move to a tiny island, the Île de St.-Pierre, having a solitary house. Although it was within the Canton of Bern, from where he had been expelled two years previously, he was informally assured that he could move into this island house without fear of arrest, and he did so (10 September 1765). Here, despite the remoteness of his retreat, visitors sought him out as a celebrity.

On 17 October 1765, the Senate of Bern ordered Rousseau to leave the island and all Bernese territory within fifteen days. He replied, requesting permission to extend his stay, and offered to be incarcerated in any place within their jurisdiction with only a few books in his possession and permission to walk occasionally in a garden while living at his own expense. The Senate's response was to direct Rousseau to leave the island, and all Bernese territory, within twenty-four hours. On 29 October 1765 he left the Île de St.-Pierre and moved to Strasbourg. At this point he received invitations from several parties in Europe, and soon decided to accept Hume's invitation to go to England.

On 9 December 1765, having secured a passport from the French government, Rousseau left Strasbourg for Paris where he arrived a week later and lodged in a palace of his friend, the Prince of Conti. Here he met Hume, and also numerous friends and well-wishers, and became a conspicuous figure in the city. At this time, Hume wrote: "It is impossible to express or imagine the enthusiasm of this nation in Rousseau's favor...No person ever so much enjoyed their attention...Voltaire and everybody else are quite eclipsed.

Although Diderot at this time desired a reconciliation with Rousseau, both of them expected an initiative by the other, and the two did not meet.

==== Letter of Walpole ====
On 1 January 1766, Grimm included in his "Correspondance littéraire" a letter said to have been written by Frederick the Great to Rousseau. It had actually been composed by Horace Walpole as a playful hoax. (Note: "My present fame is owing to a very trifling composition, but which has made incredible noise. I was one evening at Mme Geoffrin's joking on Rousseau's affectations and contradictions, and said some things that diverted them. When I came home I put them in a letter, and showed it next day to Helvetius and the Duc de Nivernois; who were so pleased with it that, after telling me some faults in the language, ... they encouraged me to let it be seen. As you know, I willingly laugh at mountebanks, political or literary, let their talents be ever so great; I was not averse. The copies have spread like wildfire, et me voici à la mode [and behold, I am in fashion] ... Here is the letter: The King of Prussia to M.Rousseau: My dear Jean Jacques: 'You have renounced Geneva, your fatherland; you have had yourself chased from Switzerland, a country so much praised in your writings; France has issued a warrant against you. Come, then, to me; I admire your talents; I am amused by your dreams, which (be it said in passing) occupy you too much and too long. You must at last be wise and happy. You have had yourself talked of enough for peculiarities hardly fitting to a truly great man. Show your enemies that you can sometimes have common sense; this will annoy them without doing you harm. My states offer you a peaceful retreat; I wish you well, and would like to help you if you can find it good. But if you continue to reject my aid, be assured that I shall tell no one. If you persist in racking your brains to find new misfortunes, choose such as you may desire; I am king, and can procure any to suit your wishes; and—what surely will never happen to you among your enemies—I shall cease to persecute you when you cease to find your glory in being persecuted.' Your good friend, Frederick —Horace Walpole's letter to H. S. Conway, dated 12 January 1766) Walpole had never met Rousseau, but he was well acquainted with Diderot and Grimm. The letter soon found wide publicity; Hume is believed to have been present, and to have participated in its creation. On 16 February 1766, Hume wrote to the Marquise de Brabantane: "The only pleasantry I permitted myself in connection with the pretended letter of the King of Prussia was made by me at the dinner table of Lord Ossory." This letter was one of the reasons for the later rupture in Hume's relations with Rousseau.

=== In Britain ===
On 4 January 1766 Rousseau left Paris with Hume, the merchant De Luze (an old friend of Rousseau), and Rousseau's pet dog Sultan. After a four-day journey to Calais, where they stayed for two nights, the travelers embarked on a ship to Dover. On 13 January 1766 they arrived in London. Soon after their arrival, David Garrick arranged a box at the Drury Lane Theatre for Hume and Rousseau on a night when the King and Queen also attended. Garrick was himself performing in a comedy by himself, and also in a tragedy by Voltaire. Rousseau became so excited during the performance that he leaned too far and almost fell out of the box; Hume observed that the King and Queen were looking at Rousseau more than at the performance. Afterwards, Garrick served supper for Rousseau, who commended Garrick's acting: "Sir, you have made me shed tears at your tragedy, and smile at your comedy, though I scarce understood a word of your language."

At this time, Hume had a favorable opinion of Rousseau. In a letter to Madame de Brabantane, Hume wrote that after observing Rousseau carefully he had concluded that he had never met a more affable and virtuous person. According to Hume, Rousseau was "gentle, modest, affectionate, disinterested, of extreme sensitivity". Initially, Hume lodged Rousseau in the house of Madam Adams in London, but Rousseau began receiving so many visitors that he soon wanted to move to a quieter location. An offer came to lodge him in a Welsh monastery, and he was inclined to accept it, but Hume persuaded him to move to Chiswick. Rousseau now asked for Thérèse to rejoin him.

Meanwhile, James Boswell, then in Paris, offered to escort Thérèse to Rousseau. Boswell had earlier met Rousseau and Thérèse at Motiers. He had sent Thérèse a garnet necklace and had written to Rousseau seeking permission to communicate occasionally with her. Hume foresaw what was going to happen: "I dread some event fatal to our friend's honor." Boswell and Thérèse were together for more than a week, and as per notes in Boswell's diary they consummated the relationship, having intercourse several times. On one occasion, Thérèse told Boswell: "Don't imagine you are a better lover than Rousseau."

Since Rousseau was keen to relocate to a more remote location, Richard Davenport—a wealthy and elderly widower who spoke French—offered to accommodate Thérèse and Rousseau at Wootton Hall in Staffordshire. On 22 March 1766 Rousseau and Thérèse set forth for Wootton, against Hume's advice. Hume and Rousseau would never meet again. Initially Rousseau liked his new accommodation at Wootton Hall and wrote favorably about the natural beauty of the place, and how he was feeling reborn, forgetting past sorrows.

==== Quarrel with Hume ====
On 3 April 1766 a daily newspaper published the letter constituting Horace Walpole's hoax on Rousseau—without mentioning Walpole as the actual author; that the editor of the publication was Hume's personal friend compounded Rousseau's grief. Gradually articles critical of Rousseau started appearing in the British press; Rousseau felt that Hume, as his host, ought to have defended him. Moreover, in Rousseau's opinion, some of the public criticism contained details to which only Hume was privy. Further, Rousseau was aggrieved to find that Hume had been lodging in London with François Tronchin, son of Rousseau's enemy in Geneva.

About this time, Voltaire anonymously (as always) published his Letter to Dr. J.-J. Pansophe in which he gave extracts from many of Rousseau's prior statements which were critical of life in England; the most damaging portions of Voltaire's writeup were reprinted in a London periodical. Rousseau now decided that there was a conspiracy afoot to defame him. A further cause for Rousseau's displeasure was his concern that Hume might be tampering with his mail. The misunderstanding had arisen because Rousseau tired of receiving voluminous correspondence whose postage he had to pay. (Note: In those days in Europe the recipient had to pay for the postage for any mail received.) Hume offered to open Rousseau's mail himself and to forward the important letters to Rousseau; this offer was accepted. However, there is some evidence of Hume intercepting even Rousseau's outgoing mail.

After some correspondence with Rousseau, which included an eighteen-page letter from Rousseau describing the reasons for his resentment, Hume concluded that Rousseau was losing his mental balance. On learning that Rousseau had denounced him to his Parisian friends, Hume sent a copy of Rousseau's long letter to Madame de Boufflers. She replied stating that, in her estimation, Hume's alleged participation in the composition of Horace Walpole's faux letter was the reason for Rousseau's anger. (Note: "Rousseau's letter is atrocious; it is to the last degree extravagant and inexcusable ... But do not believe him capable of any falsehood or artifice; nor imagine that he is either an impostor or a scoundrel. His anger has no just cause, but it is sincere; of that I feel no doubt. Here is what I imagine to be the cause of it. I have heard it said, and he has perhaps been told, that one of the best phrases in Mr Walpole's letter was by you, and that you had said in jest, speaking in the name of the King of Prussia, 'If you wish for persecutions, I am a king, and can procure them for you of any sort you like,' and that Mr Walpole ... had said you were its author. If this be true, and Rousseau knows of it, do you wonder that, sensitive, hot-headed, melancholy, and proud, ... he has become enraged?"—Madame de Boufflers's letter to David Hume, written in 1766.)

When Hume learnt that Rousseau was writing the Confessions, he assumed that the present dispute would feature in the book. Adam Smith, Turgot, Marischal Keith, Horace Walpole, and Mme de Boufflers advised Hume not to make his quarrel with Rousseau public; however, many members of Holbach's coterie—particularly D'Alembert—urged him to reveal his version of the events. In October 1766 Hume's version of the quarrel was translated into French and published in France; in November it was published in England. Grimm included it in his Correspondance littéraire; ultimately:

...the quarrel resounded in Geneva, Amsterdam, Berlin, and St. Petersburg. A dozen pamphlets redoubled the bruit. Walpole printed his version of the dispute; Boswell attacked Walpole; Mme. de La Tour's Precis sur M. Rousseau called Hume a traitor; Voltaire sent him additional material on Rousseau's faults and crimes, on his frequentation of "places of ill fame", and on his seditious activities in Switzerland. George III "followed the battle with intense curiosity".

After the dispute became public, due in part to comments from notable publishers like Andrew Millar, Walpole told Hume that quarrels such as this only end up becoming a source of amusement for Europe. Diderot took a charitable view of the mess: "I knew these two philosophers well. I could write a play about them that would make you weep, and it would excuse them both." Amidst the controversy surrounding his quarrel with Hume, Rousseau maintained a public silence; but he resolved now to return to France. To encourage him to do so swiftly, Thérèse advised him that the servants at Wootton Hall sought to poison him. On 22 May 1767 Rousseau and Thérèse embarked from Dover for Calais.

=== In Grenoble ===
On 22 May 1767, Rousseau reentered France even though an arrest warrant against him was still in place. He had taken an assumed name, but was recognized, and a banquet in his honor was held by the city of Amiens. French nobles offered him a residence at this time. Initially, Rousseau decided to stay in an estate near Paris belonging to Mirabeau. Subsequently, on 21 June 1767, he moved to a chateau of the Prince of Conti in Trie.

Around this time, Rousseau started developing feelings of paranoia, anxiety, and of a conspiracy against him. Most of this was just his imagination at work, but on 29 January 1768, the theatre at Geneva was destroyed through burning, and Voltaire mendaciously accused Rousseau of being the culprit. In June 1768, Rousseau left Trie, leaving Thérèse behind, and went first to Lyon, and subsequently to Bourgoin. He now invited Thérèse to this place and married her, (Note: Rousseau and Thérèse le Vasseur were not legally married nor married in church. A faux marriage took place instead in Bourgoin in 1768. Rousseau himself writes in a Letter to Madame de Luxembourg (1761): "... je lui ai déclaré que je ne l'épouserais jamais; et même un mariage public nous eût été impossible à cause de la différence de religion ..." Eyewitnesses have declared that he didn't even use his own name, but "Renou", which was his alias when he was on the run. He neither conformed to the official formalities of a legal marriage. There were two "witnesses" present: Mr. de Champagneux, mayor of Bourgoin, and a Mr. de Rozière; both were artillery officers.) under his alias "Renou" in a faux civil ceremony in Bourgoin on 30 August 1768.

In January 1769, Rousseau and Thérèse went to live in a farmhouse near Grenoble. Here he practiced botany and completed the Confessions. At this time he expressed regret for placing his children in an orphanage. On 10 April 1770, Rousseau and Thérèse left for Lyon where he befriended Horace Coignet, a fabric designer and amateur musician. At Rousseau's suggestion, Coignet composed musical interludes for Rousseau's prose poem Pygmalion; this was performed in Lyon together with Rousseau's romance The Village Soothsayer to public acclaim. On 8 June, Rousseau and Thérèse left Lyon for Paris; they reached Paris on 24 June.

In Paris, Rousseau and Thérèse lodged in an unfashionable neighborhood of the city, the Rue Platrière—now called the Rue Jean-Jacques Rousseau. He now supported himself financially by copying music, and continued his study of botany. At this time also, he wrote his Letters on the Elements of Botany. These consisted of a series of letters Rousseau wrote to Mme Delessert in Lyon to help her daughters learn the subject. These letters received widespread acclaim when they were eventually published posthumously. "It's a true pedagogical model, and it complements Emile," commented Goethe.

In order to defend his reputation against hostile gossip, Rousseau had begun writing the Confessions in 1765. In November 1770, these were completed, and although he did not wish to publish them at this time, he began to offer group readings of certain portions of the book. Between December 1770, and May 1771, Rousseau made at least four group readings of his book with the final reading lasting seventeen hours. A witness to one of these sessions, Claude Joseph Dorat, wrote:

I expected a session of seven or eight hours; it lasted fourteen or fifteen. ... The writing is truly a phenomenon of genius, of simplicity, candor, and courage. How many giants reduced to dwarves! How many obscure but virtuous men restored to their rights and avenged against the wicked by the sole testimony of an honest man!

After May 1771, there were no more group readings because Madame d'Épinay wrote to the chief of police, who was her friend, to put a stop to Rousseau's readings so as to safeguard her privacy. The police called on Rousseau, who agreed to stop the readings. His Confessions were finally published posthumously in 1782.

In 1772, Rousseau was invited to present recommendations for a new constitution for the Polish–Lithuanian Commonwealth, resulting in the Considerations on the Government of Poland, which was to be his last major political work.

Also in 1772, Rousseau began writing Rousseau, Judge of Jean-Jacques, which was another attempt to reply to his critics. He completed writing it in 1776. The book is in the form of three dialogues between two characters; a "Frenchman" and "Rousseau", who argue about the merits and demerits of a third character—an author called Jean-Jacques. It has been described as his most unreadable work; in the foreword to the book, Rousseau admits that it may be repetitious and disorderly, but he begs the reader's indulgence on the grounds that he needs to defend his reputation from slander before he dies.

=== Final years ===
In 1766, Rousseau had impressed Hume with his physical prowess by spending ten hours at night on the deck in severe weather during the journey by ship from Calais to Dover while Hume was confined to his bunk. "When all the seamen were almost frozen to death...he caught no harm...He is one of the most robust men I have ever known," Hume noted. His urinary disease had also been greatly alleviated after he stopped listening to the advice of doctors. At that time, notes Damrosch, it was often better to let nature take its own course rather than subject oneself to medical procedures. His general health had also improved.

On 24 October 1776, as he was walking on a narrow street in Paris, a nobleman's carriage came rushing by from the opposite direction. Flanking the carriage was a galloping Great Dane belonging to the nobleman. Rousseau was unable to dodge both the carriage and the dog and was knocked down by the Great Dane. He seems to have suffered a concussion and neurological damage. His health began to decline; Rousseau's friend Corancez described the appearance of certain symptoms which indicate that Rousseau started suffering from epileptic seizures after the accident.

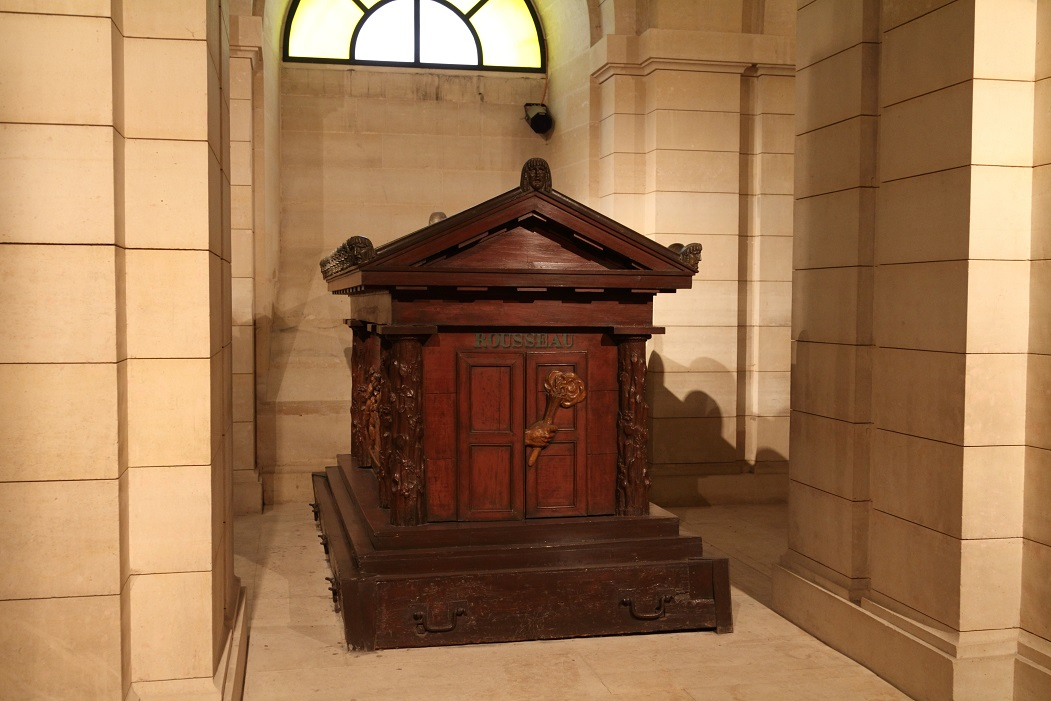
The tomb of Rousseau in the crypt of the Panthéon, Paris

In 1777, Rousseau received a royal visitor, when the Holy Roman Emperor Joseph II came to meet him. His free entry to the Opera had been renewed by this time and he would go there occasionally. At this time also (1777–1778), he composed one of his finest works, Reveries of a Solitary Walker, ultimately interrupted by his death.

In the spring of 1778, the Marquis Girardin invited Rousseau to live in a cottage in his château at Ermenonville. Rousseau and Thérèse went there on 20 May. Rousseau spent his time at the château in collecting botanical specimens, and teaching botany to Girardin's son. He ordered books from Paris on grasses, mosses and mushrooms and made plans to complete his unfinished Emile and Sophie and Daphnis and Chloe.

On 1 July, a visitor commented that "men are wicked," to which Rousseau replied with "men are wicked, yes, but man is good". In the evening there was a concert in the château in which Rousseau played on the piano his own composition of the Willow Song from Othello. On this day also, he had a hearty meal with Girardin's family. The next morning, as he was about to go teach music to Girardin's daughter, he died of cerebral bleeding resulting in an apoplectic stroke. It is now believed that repeated falls, including the accident involving the Great Dane, may have contributed to Rousseau's stroke.

Following his death, Grimm, Madame de Staël and others spread the false news that Rousseau had committed suicide; according to other gossip, Rousseau was insane when he died. All those who met him in his last days agree that he was in a serene frame of mind at this time.

On 4 July 1778, Rousseau was buried on the Île des Peupliers, a tiny, wooded island in a lake at Ermenonville, which became a place of pilgrimage for his many admirers. On 11 October 1794, his remains were moved to the Panthéon, where they were placed near those of Voltaire. (Note: "From that haven of neighborly peace their spirits rose to renew their war for the soul of the Revolution, of France, and of Western man." —Will and Ariel Durant.)

== Philosophy ==
=== Influences ===
Rousseau later noted that when he read the question for the essay competition of the Academy of Dijon, which he would go on to win: "Has the rebirth of the arts and sciences contributed to the purification of the morals?", he felt that "the moment I read this announcement I saw another universe and became a different man". The essay he wrote in response led to one of the central themes of Rousseau's thought, which was that perceived social and cultural progress had in fact led only to the moral degradation of humanity. His influences to this conclusion included Montesquieu, François Fénelon, Michel de Montaigne, Seneca the Younger, Plato, and Plutarch.

Rousseau based his political philosophy on contract theory and his reading of Thomas Hobbes. Reacting to the ideas of Samuel von Pufendorf and John Locke was also driving his thought. All three thinkers had believed that humans living without central authority were facing uncertain conditions in a state of mutual competition. In contrast, Rousseau believed that there was no explanation for why this would be the case, as there would have been no conflict or property. Rousseau especially criticized Hobbes for asserting that since man in the "state of nature... has no idea of goodness he must be naturally wicked; that he is vicious because he does not know virtue". On the contrary, Rousseau holds that "uncorrupted morals" prevail in the "state of nature".

=== Human nature ===
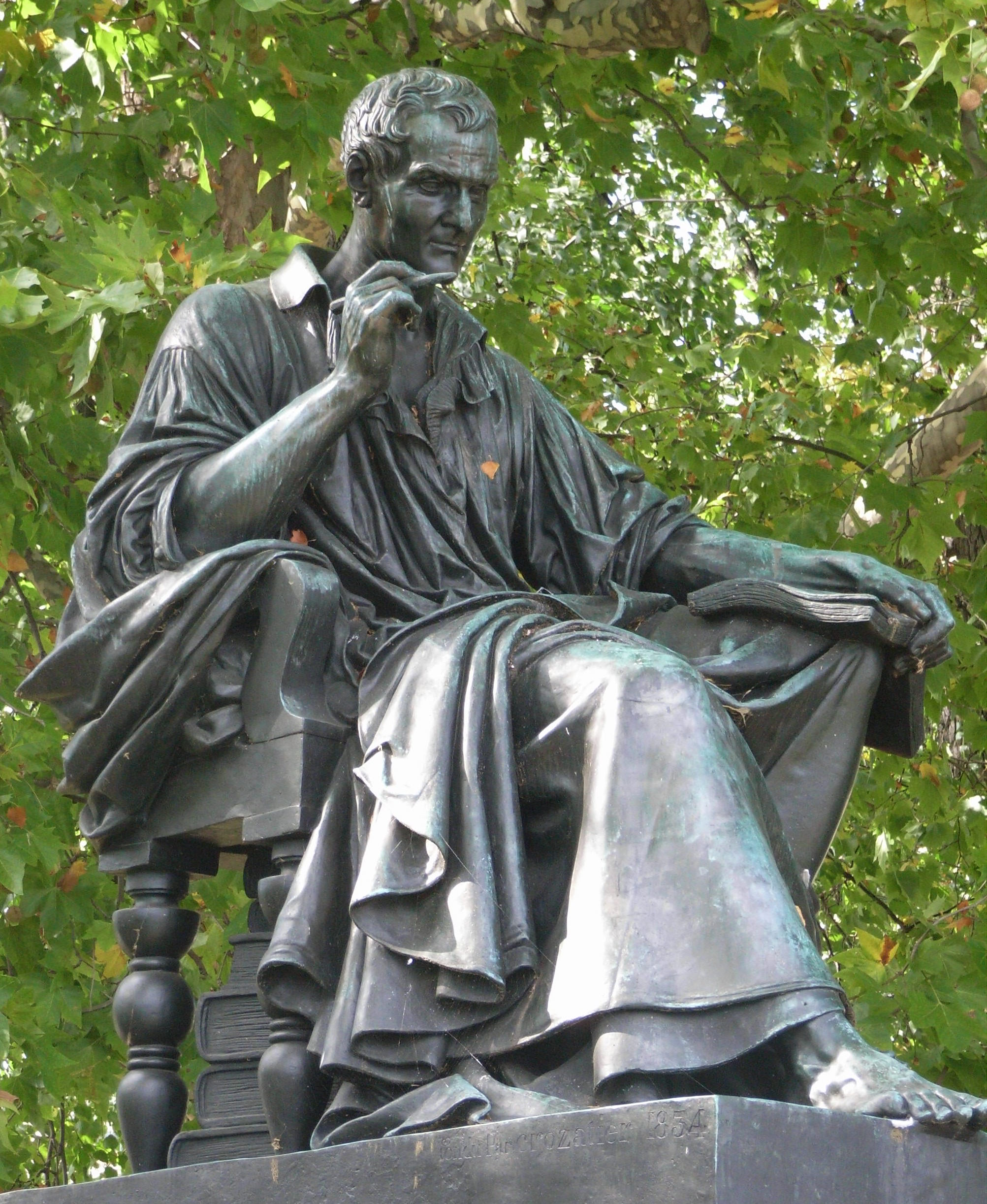
Statue of Rousseau on the Île Rousseau, Geneva

The first man who, having fenced in a piece of land, said 'This is mine', and found people naïve enough to believe him, that man was the true founder of civil society. From how many crimes, wars, and murders, from how many horrors and misfortunes might not any one have saved mankind, by pulling up the stakes, or filling up the ditch, and crying to his fellows: Beware of listening to this impostor; you are undone if you once forget that the fruits of the earth belong to us all, and the earth itself to nobody.

— Rousseau 1754

In common with other philosophers of the day, Rousseau looked to a hypothetical "state of nature" as a normative guide. In the original condition, humans would have had "no moral relations with or determinate obligations to one another". Because of their rare contact with each other, differences between individuals would have been of little significance. Living separately, there would have been no feelings of envy or distrust, and no existence of property or conflict.

According to Rousseau, humans have two traits in common with other animals: the amour de soi, which describes the self-preservation instinct; and pitié, which is empathy for the rest of one's species, both of which precede reason and sociability. Only humans who are morally deprived would care only about their relative status to others, leading to amour-propre, or vanity. He did not believe humans to be innately superior to other species. However, human beings did have the unique ability to change their nature through free choice, instead of being confined to natural instincts.

Another aspect separating humans from other animals is the ability of perfectability, which allows humans to choose in a way that improves their condition. These improvements could be lasting, leading not only to individual, but also collective change for the better. Together with human freedom, the ability to improve makes possible the historic evolution of humanity. However, there is no guarantee that this evolution will be for the better.

=== Human development ===
Rousseau asserted that the stage of human development associated with what he called "savages" was the best or optimal in human development, between the less-than-optimal extreme of brute animals on the one hand and the extreme of decadent civilization on the other.

... nothing is so gentle as man in his primitive state, when placed by nature at an equal distance from the stupidity of brutes and the fatal enlightenment of civil man.

This has led some critics to attribute to Rousseau the invention of the idea of the noble savage, (Note: An early recorded use in French language of a specific expression explicitly associating the words 'savage' and 'noble' is Lescarbot, Marc (1609), "Sauvages sont vrayement nobles", Histoire de la Nouvelle France [History of the New France] (in French), p. 786, "... revenons à notre Nouvelle-France, ou les hommes sont plus humains et ne vivent que de ce que Dieu a donné à l'homme, sans devorer leurs semblables. Aussi faut-il dire d'eux qu'ils sont vrayment Nobles ...'") (Note: Some writers still use the term "noble savage" in describing race relations in New France, for example Garraway, Doris L. (8 July 2005), The Libertine Colony, Duke University Press, p. 95, ISBN 0-8223-8651-8.) which Arthur Lovejoy claimed misrepresents Rousseau's thought.

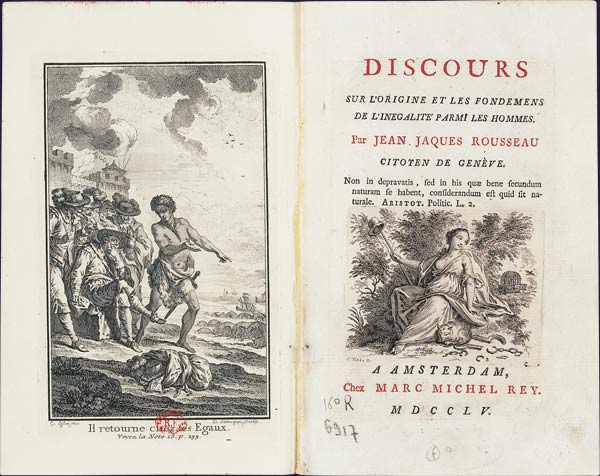
Rousseau (1755), Discourse on Inequality, Holland, frontispiece and title page

According to Rousseau, as savages had grown less dependent on nature, they had instead become dependent on each other, with society leading to the loss of freedom through the misapplication of perfectibility. When living together, humans would have gone from a nomadic lifestyle to a settled one, leading to the invention of private property. However, the resulting inequality was not a natural outcome, but rather the product of human choice.

Rousseau's ideas of human development were highly interconnected with forms of mediation or the processes that individual humans use to interact with themselves and others while using an alternate perspective or thought process. According to Rousseau, these were developed through the innate perfectibility of humanity. These include a sense of self, morality, pity, and imagination. Rousseau's writings are purposely ambiguous concerning the formation of these processes to the point that mediation is always intrinsically part of humanity's development. An example of this is the notion that an individual needs an alternative perspective to realize that he or she is a 'self'.

As long as differences in wealth and status among families were minimal, the first coming together in groups was accompanied by a fleeting golden age of human flourishing. The development of agriculture, metallurgy, private property, and the division of labour and resulting dependency on one another, however, led to economic inequality and conflict. As population pressures forced them to associate more and more closely, they underwent a psychological transformation: they began to see themselves through the eyes of others and came to value the good opinions of others as essential to their self-esteem.

As humans started to compare themselves with each other, they began to notice that some had qualities differentiating them from others. However, only when moral significance was attached to these qualities did they start to create esteem and envy, and thereby, social hierarchies. Rousseau noted that whereas "the savage lives within himself, sociable man, always outside himself, can only live in the opinion of others". This then resulted in the corruption of humankind, "producing combinations fatal to innocence and happiness".

Following the attachment of importance to human difference, they would have started forming social institutions, according to Rousseau. Metallurgy and agriculture would have subsequently increased the inequalities between those with and without property. After all land had been converted into private properties, a zero-sum game would have resulted in competition for it, leading to conflict. This would have led to the creation and perpetuation of the 'hoax' of the political system by the rich, which perpetuated their power.

=== Political theory ===
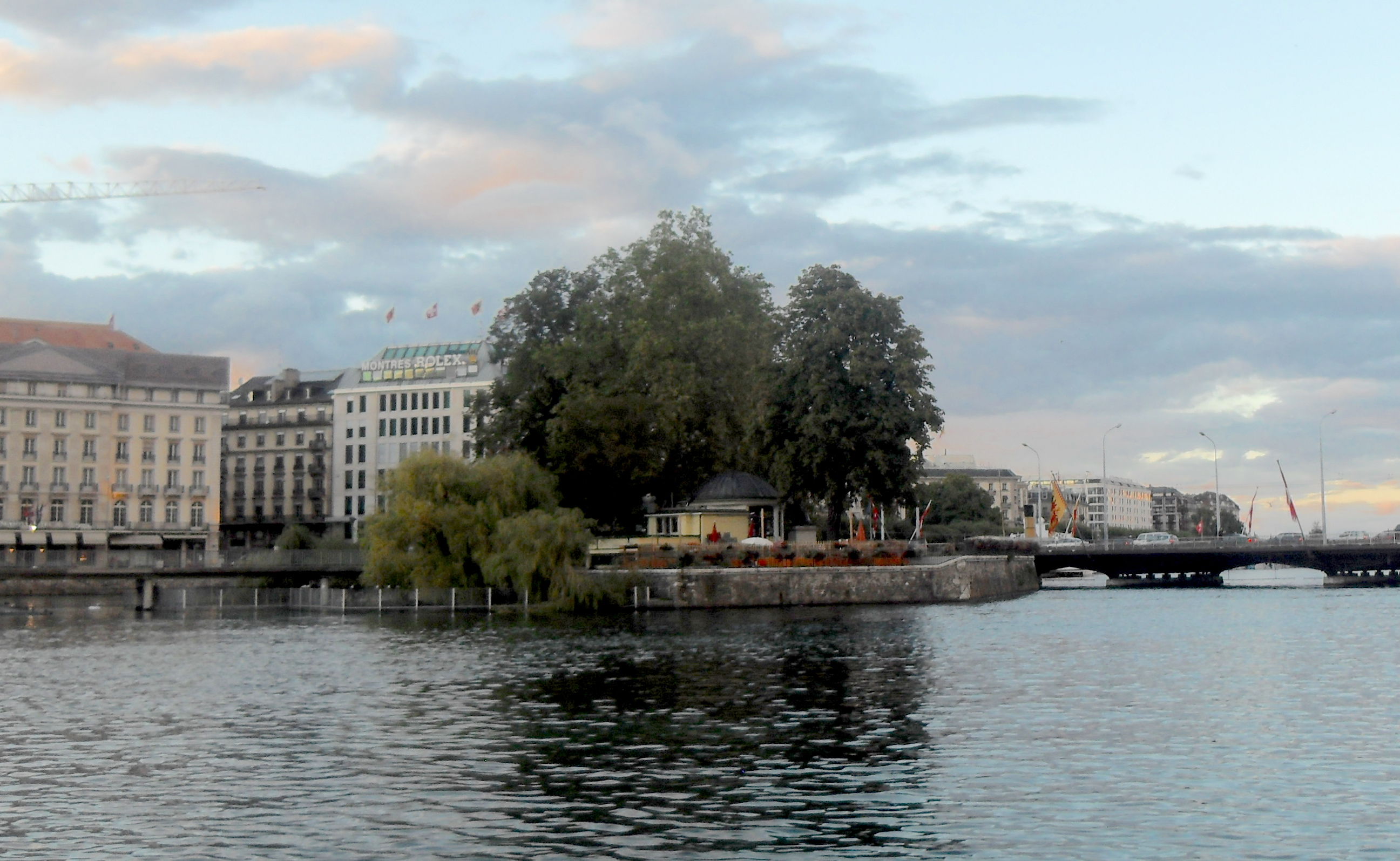
Île Rousseau, Geneva

According to Rousseau, the original forms of government to emerge - monarchy, aristocracy, and democracy - were all products of the differing levels of inequality in their societies. However, they would always end up with ever worse levels of inequality, until a revolution would have overthrown it and new leaders would have emerged with further extremes of injustice. Nevertheless, the human capacity for self-improvement remained. As the problems of humanity were the product of political choice, they could also be improved by a better political system.

The Social Contract outlines the basis for a legitimate political order within a framework of classical republicanism. Published in 1762, it became one of the most influential works of political philosophy in the Western tradition. It developed some of the ideas mentioned in an earlier work, the article Économie Politique (Discourse on Political Economy), featured in Diderot's Encyclopédie. In the book, Rousseau sketched the image of a new political system for regaining human freedom.

Rousseau claimed that the state of nature was a primitive condition without law or morality, which human beings left for the benefits and necessity of cooperation. As society developed, the division of labor and private property required the human race to adopt institutions of law. In the degenerate phase of society, man is prone to be in frequent competition with his fellow men while also becoming increasingly dependent on them. This double pressure threatens both his survival and his freedom.

According to Rousseau, by joining into civil society through the social contract and abandoning their claims of natural right, individuals can both preserve themselves and remain free. This is because submission to the authority of the general will of the people as a whole guarantees individuals against being subordinated to the wills of others and also ensures that they obey themselves because they are, collectively, the authors of the law.

Although Rousseau argues that sovereignty (or the power to make the laws) should be in the hands of the people, he also makes a sharp distinction between the sovereign and the government. The government is composed of magistrates, charged with implementing and enforcing the general will. The "sovereign" is the rule of law, ideally decided on by direct democracy in an assembly.

Rousseau opposed the idea that the people should exercise sovereignty via a representative assembly (Book III, chapter XV). He approved the form of republican government of the city-state, for which Geneva provided a model—or would have done if renewed on Rousseau's principles. France could not meet Rousseau's criterion of an ideal state because it was too big. Much subsequent controversy about Rousseau's work has hinged on disagreements concerning his claims that citizens constrained to obey the general will are thereby rendered free:

The notion of the general will is wholly central to Rousseau's theory of political legitimacy. ... It is, however, an unfortunately obscure and controversial notion. Some commentators see it as no more than the dictatorship of the proletariat or the tyranny of the urban poor (such as may perhaps be seen in the French Revolution). Such was not Rousseau's meaning. This is clear from the Discourse on Political Economy, where Rousseau emphasizes that the general will exists to protect individuals against the mass, not to require them to be sacrificed to it. He is, of course, sharply aware that men have selfish and sectional interests which will lead them to try to oppress others. It is for this reason that loyalty to the good of all alike must be a supreme (although not exclusive) commitment by everyone, not only if a truly general will is to be heeded but also if it is to be formulated successfully in the first place.

A remarkable peculiarity of Social Contract is its logical rigor, which Rousseau had learned in his twenties from mathematics:

Rousseau develops his theory in an almost mathematical manner, deriving statements from the initial thesis that man must keep close to nature. The 'natural' state, with its original liberty and equality, is hindered by man's 'unnatural' involvement in collective activities resulting in inequality which, in turn, infringes on liberty. The purpose of this social contract, which is a kind of tacit agreement, is simply to guarantee equality and, consequently, liberty as the superior social values... A number of political statements, particularly about the organization of powers, are derived from the 'axioms' of equality among citizens and their subordination to the general will.

— Andranik Tangian (2014) Mathematical Theory of Democracy

=== Economic theory ===
Rousseau offers a wealth of economic thought in his writings, especially the Discourse on Inequality, Discourse on Political Economy, the Social Contract, as well as his constitutional projects for Corsica and Poland. Rousseau's economic theory has been criticised as sporadic and unrigorous by later economists such as Joseph Schumpeter, but has been praised by historians of economic thought for its nuanced view of finance and mature thought on development. Scholars generally accept that Rousseau offers a critique of modern wealth and luxury. He proposed luxury taxes and progressive income taxes to facilitate a certain amount of redistribution of wealth. Moreover, Rousseau's economic thought is associated with agrarianism and Autarkism. Historian Istvan Hont modifies this reading, however, by suggesting that Rousseau is both a critic and a thinker of commerce, leaving room for well-regulated commerce within a well-governed civil space. Political theorists Ryan Hanley and Hansong Li further argue that as a modern legislator, Rousseau seeks not to reject, but to tame utility, self-love, and even trade, finance, and luxury to serve the health of the republic.

=== Education and child rearing ===
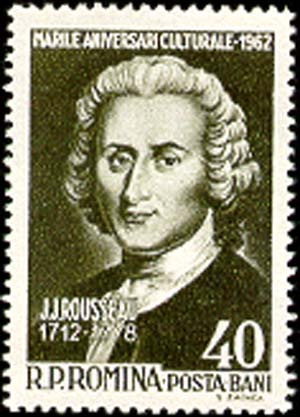
Rousseau on a Romanian stamp, 1962

The noblest work in education is to make a reasoning man, and we expect to train a young child by making him reason! This is beginning at the end; this is making an instrument of a result. If children understood how to reason they would not need to be educated.

— Rousseau, Émile, p. 52

Rousseau's philosophy of education concerns itself not with particular techniques of imparting information and concepts, but rather with developing the pupil's character and moral sense, so that he may learn to practice self-mastery and remain virtuous even in the unnatural and imperfect society in which he will have to live. A hypothetical boy, Émile, is to be raised in the countryside, which, Rousseau believes, is a more natural and healthy environment than the city, under the guardianship of a tutor who will guide him through various learning experiences arranged by the tutor. Today we would call this the disciplinary method of "natural consequences". Rousseau felt that children learn right and wrong through experiencing the consequences of their acts rather than through physical punishment. The tutor will make sure that no harm results to Émile through his learning experiences.

Rousseau became an early advocate of developmentally appropriate education; his description of the stages of child development mirrors his conception of the evolution of culture. He divides childhood into stages:

1. The first to the age of about 12, when children are guided by their emotions and impulses
2. During the second stage, from 12 to about 16, reason starts to develop
3. Finally the third stage, from the age of 16 onwards, when the child develops into an adult

Rousseau recommends that the young adult learn a manual skill such as carpentry, which requires creativity and thought, will keep him out of trouble, and will supply a fallback means of making a living in the event of a change of fortune (the most illustrious aristocratic youth to have been educated this way may have been Louis XVI, whose parents had him learn the skill of locksmithing).

Rousseau was a believer in the moral superiority of the patriarchal family on the antique Roman model. Sophie, the young woman Émile is destined to marry, as his representative of ideal womanhood, is educated to be governed by her husband while Émile, as his representative of the ideal man, is educated to be self-governing. This is not an accidental feature of Rousseau's educational and political philosophy; it is essential to his account of the distinction between private, personal relations and the public world of political relations. The private sphere, as Rousseau imagines it, depends on the subordination of women for both it and the public political sphere (upon which it depends) to function as Rousseau imagines it could and should. Rousseau anticipated the modern idea of the bourgeois nuclear family, with the mother at home taking responsibility for the household and for childcare and early education.

Feminists, beginning in the late 18th century with Mary Wollstonecraft in 1792, have criticized Rousseau for his confinement of women to the domestic sphere. Unless women were domesticated and constrained by modesty and shame, he feared "men would be tyrannized by women ... For, given the ease with which women arouse men's senses—men would finally be their victims ..." Rousseau also believed that Mothers were to breastfeed their children rather than use wet-nurses. Marmontel wrote that his wife often said, "We must pardon him something, who has taught us to be mothers" (meaning Rousseau).

Rousseau's ideas have influenced progressive "child-centered" education. John Darling's 1994 book Child-Centered Education and its Critics portrays the history of modern educational theory as a series of footnotes to Rousseau, a development he regards as bad. The theories of educators such as Rousseau's near contemporaries Pestalozzi, Mme. de Genlis and, later, Maria Montessori and John Dewey, which have directly influenced modern educational practices, have significant points in common with those of Rousseau.

== Religion ==
Having converted to Catholicism early in life and returned to the austere Calvinism of his native Geneva as part of his period of moral reform, Rousseau maintained a profession of that religious philosophy and of John Calvin as a modern lawgiver throughout the remainder of his life. Unlike many of the more agnostic Enlightenment philosophers, Rousseau affirmed the necessity of religion. His views on religion presented in his works of philosophy, however, may strike some as discordant with the doctrines of both Catholicism and Calvinism.

Rousseau's strong endorsement of religious toleration, as expounded in Émile, was interpreted as advocating indifferentism, a heresy, and led to the condemnation of the book in both Calvinist Geneva and Catholic Paris. Although he praised the Bible, he was disgusted by the Christianity of his day. Rousseau's assertion in The Social Contract that true followers of Christ would not make good citizens may have been another reason for his condemnation in Geneva. He also repudiated the doctrine of original sin, which plays a large part in Calvinism. In his "Letter to Beaumont", Rousseau wrote, "there is no original perversity in the human heart."

In the 18th century, many deists viewed God merely as an abstract and impersonal creator of the universe, likened to a giant machine. Rousseau's deism differed from the usual kind in its emotionality. He saw the presence of God in the creation as good, and separate from the harmful influence of society. Rousseau's attribution of a spiritual value to the beauty of nature anticipates the attitudes of 19th-century Romanticism towards nature and religion. (Historians—notably William Everdell, Graeme Garrard, and Darrin McMahon—have additionally situated Rousseau within the Counter-Enlightenment.) Rousseau was upset that his deism was so forcefully condemned, while those of the more atheistic philosophers were ignored. He defended himself against critics of his religious views in his "Letter to Mgr de Beaumont, the Archbishop of Paris", "in which he insists that freedom of discussion in religious matters is essentially more religious than the attempt to impose belief by force."

== Composition of music ==
Rousseau was a moderately successful composer of music, who wrote seven operas as well as music in other forms, and contributed to music theory. As a composer, his music was a blend of the late Baroque style and the emergent Classical fashion, i.e. Galant, and he belongs to the same generation of transitional composers as Christoph Willibald Gluck and C. P. E. Bach. One of his better known works is the one-act opera The Village Soothsayer. It contains the duet "Non, Colette n'est point trompeuse," which was later rearranged as a song by Beethoven, and the gavotte in scene no. 8 is the source of the tune of the folk song "Go Tell Aunt Rhody". He also composed several noted motets, some of which were sung at the Concert Spirituel in Paris.

Rousseau's Aunt Suzanne was passionate about music and heavily influenced Rousseau's interest in music. In his Confessions, Rousseau claims he is "indebted" to her for his passion of music. Rousseau took formal instruction in music at the house of Françoise-Louise de Warens. She housed Rousseau on and off for about 13 years, giving him jobs and responsibilities. In 1742, Rousseau developed a system of musical notation that was compatible with typography and numbered. He presented his invention to the Académie des Sciences, but they rejected it, praising his efforts and pushing him to try again. In 1743, Rousseau wrote his first opera, Les Muses galantes, which was first performed in 1745. Rousseau also developed a style of "boustrophedon" notation which would have music read in alternating directions (right to left for a second staff, and then left to right for the next staff, for example) in an effort to allow musicians to not have to "jump" staffs while reading.

Rousseau and Jean-Philippe Rameau argued over the superiority of Italian music over French. Rousseau argued that Italian music was superior based on the principle that melody must have priority over harmony. Rameau instead argued that French music was superior based on the principle that harmony must have priority over melody. Rousseau's plea for melody introduced the idea that in art, the free expression of a creative person is more important than the strict adherence to traditional rules and procedures. This is known today as a characteristic of Romanticism. Rousseau argued for musical freedom and changed people's attitudes towards music. His works were acknowledged by composers such as Christoph Willibald Gluck and Wolfgang Amadeus Mozart. After composing The Village Soothsayer in 1752, Rousseau felt he could not go on working for the theater, because he was a moralist who had decided to break from worldly values.

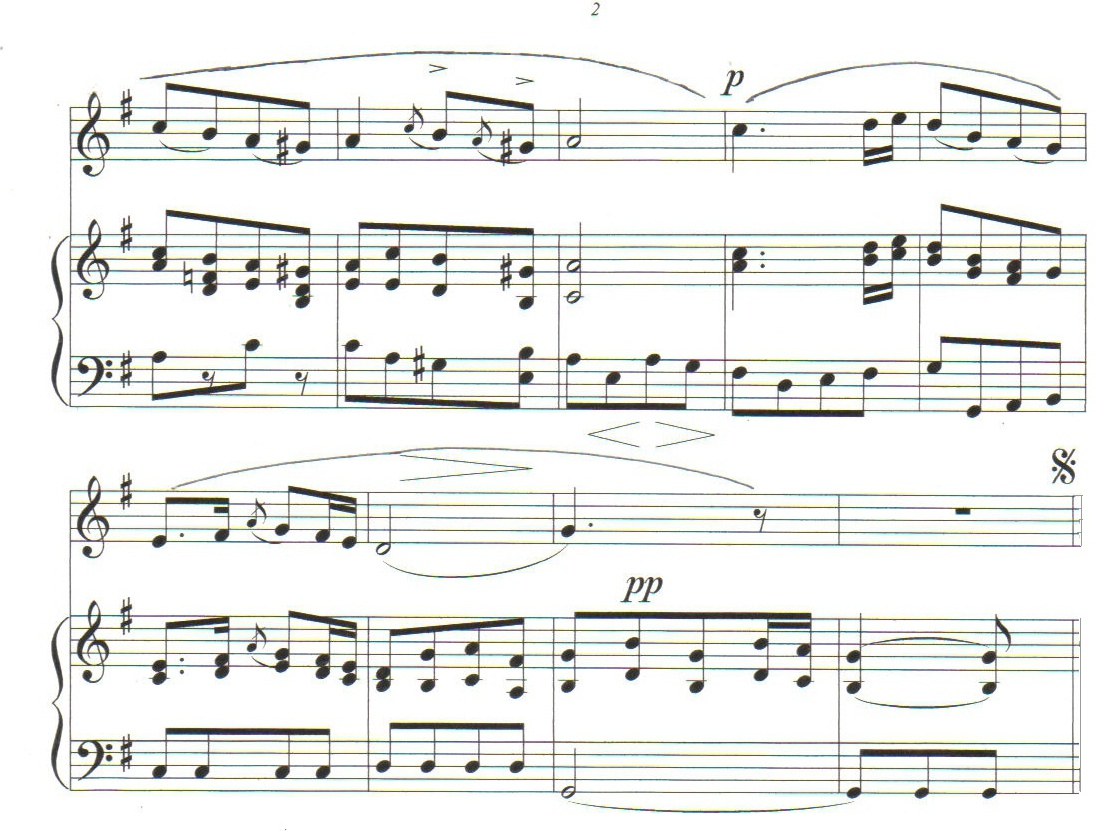
Avril, p. 2

Musical compositions

- Les Muses galantes (1743)
- Les Fetes de Remire (1745)
- Symphonie à Cors de Chasse (1751)
- Le Devin du village (1752) – opera in 1 act
- Salve Regina (1752) – antiphone
- Chansons de Bataille (1753)
- Pygmalion (1762/1770) – melodrama
- Avril – aire a poesía de Rémy Belleau
- Les Consolations des Misères de Ma Vie (1781)
- Daphnis et Chloé
- Que le jour me dure!
- Le Printemps de Vivaldi (1775)

== Legacy ==
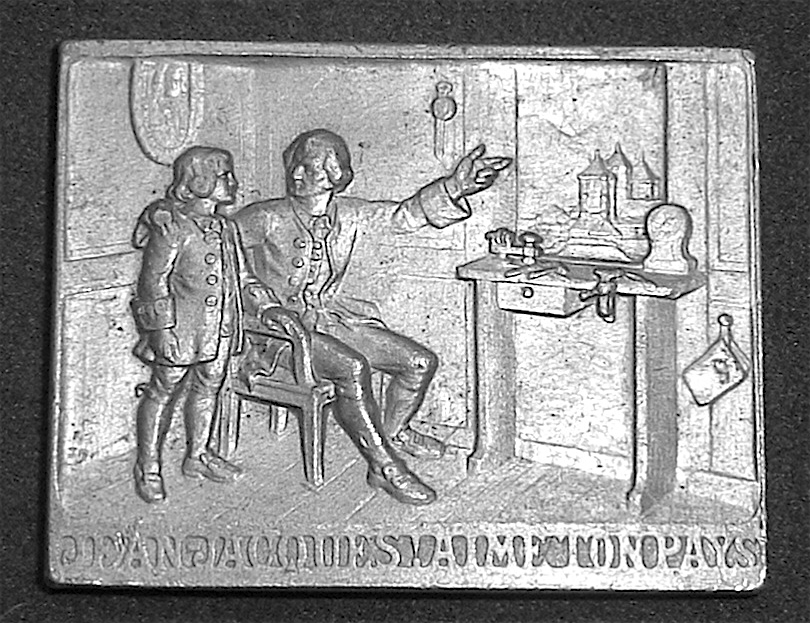
Bicentenary of Rousseau's birth (plaque), Geneva, 28 June 1912, "Jean-Jacques, aime ton pays [love your country]", showing Rousseau's father gesturing towards the window. The scene is drawn from a footnote to the Letter to d'Alembert where Rousseau recalls witnessing the popular celebrations following the exercises of the St Gervais regiment.

=== General will ===
Rousseau's idea of the "general will" was not original but rather belonged to a well-established technical vocabulary of juridical and theological writings in use at the time. The phrase was used by Diderot and also by Montesquieu (and by his teacher, the Oratorian friar Nicolas Malebranche). It served to designate the common interest embodied in legal tradition, as distinct from and transcending people's private and particular interests at any particular time. It displayed a rather democratic ideology, as it declared that the citizens of a given nation should carry out whatever actions they deem necessary in their own sovereign assembly.

Rousseau believed in a legislative process that necessitates the active involvement of every citizen in decision-making through discussion and voting. He coined this process as the "general will", the collective will of a society as a whole, even if it might not necessarily coincide with the individual desires of each member.

The concept was also an important aspect of the more radical 17th-century republican tradition of Spinoza, from whom Rousseau differed in important respects, but not in his insistence on the importance of equality:

While Rousseau's notion of the progressive moral degeneration of mankind from the moment civil society established itself diverges markedly from Spinoza's claim that human nature is always and everywhere the same ... for both philosophers the pristine equality of the state of nature is our ultimate goal and criterion ... in shaping the "common good", volonté générale, or Spinoza's mens una, which alone can ensure stability and political salvation. Without the supreme criterion of equality, the general will would indeed be meaningless. ... When in the depths of the French Revolution the Jacobin clubs all over France regularly deployed Rousseau when demanding radical reforms. and especially anything—such as land redistribution—designed to enhance equality, they were at the same time, albeit unconsciously, invoking a radical tradition which reached back to the late seventeenth century.

=== French Revolution ===
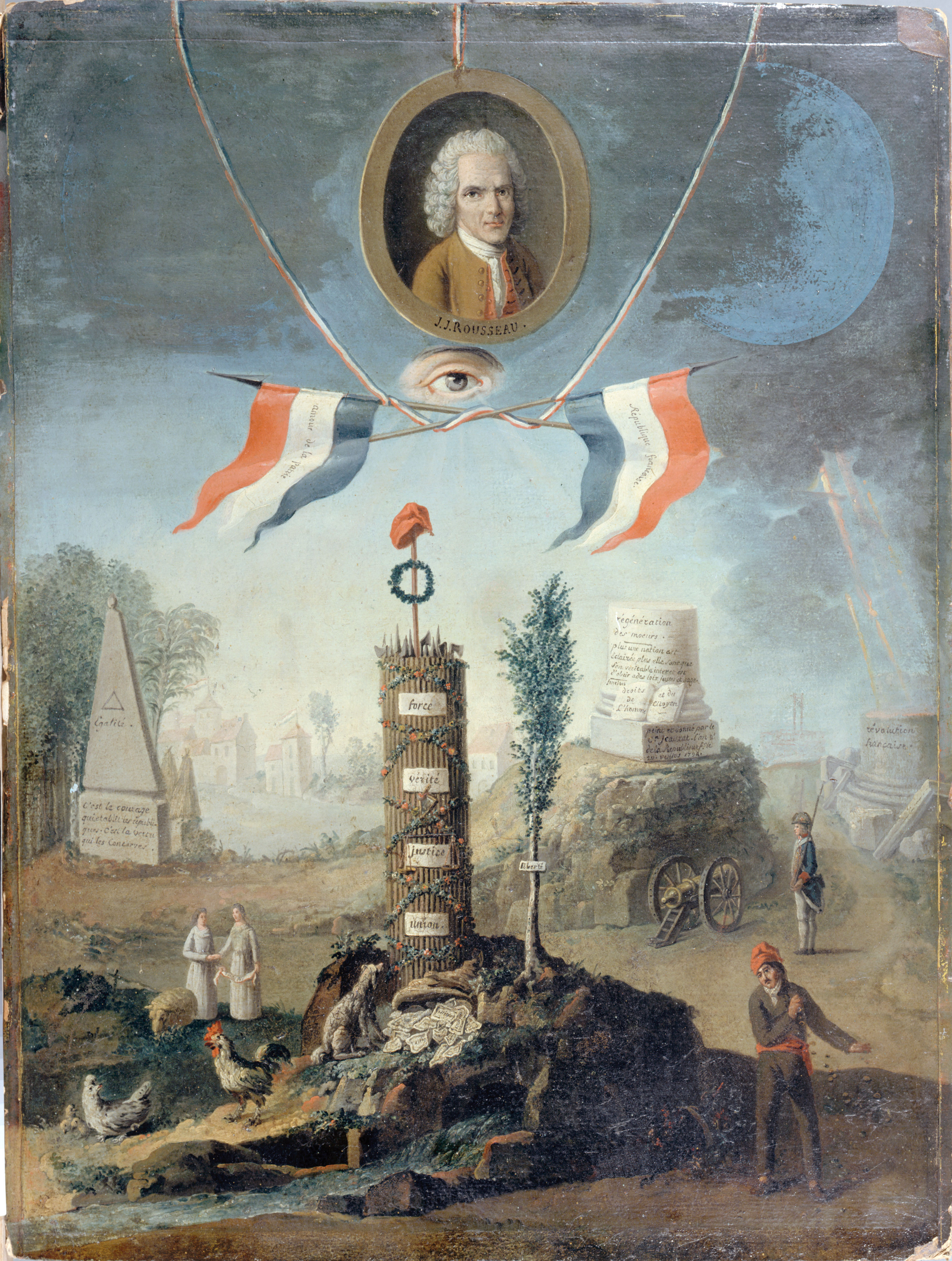
Allegory of the French Revolution in honor of Rousseau, by Nicolas Henri Jeaurat de Bertry (1794). The final version of the painting was offered to the National Convention

Robespierre and Saint-Just, during the Reign of Terror, regarded themselves to be principled egalitarian republicans, obliged to do away with superfluities and corruption; in this they were inspired most prominently by Rousseau. According to Robespierre, the deficiencies in individuals were rectified by upholding the 'common good' which he conceptualized as the collective will of the people; this idea was derived from Rousseau's General Will. The revolutionaries were also inspired by Rousseau to introduce Deism as the new official civil religion of France:

Ceremonial and symbolic occurrences of the more radical phases of the Revolution invoked Rousseau and his core ideas. Thus the ceremony held at the site of the demolished Bastille, organized by the foremost artistic director of the Revolution, Jacques-Louis David, in August 1793 to mark the inauguration of the new republican constitution, an event coming shortly after the final abolition of all forms of feudal privilege, featured a cantata based on Rousseau's democratic pantheistic deism as expounded in the celebrated "Profession de foi d'un vicaire savoyard" in book four of Émile.

Rousseau's influence on the French Revolution was noted by Edmund Burke, who critiqued Rousseau in Reflections on the Revolution in France, and this critique reverberated throughout Europe, leading Catherine the Great to ban his works. This connection between Rousseau and the French Revolution (especially the Terror) persisted through the next century. As François Furet notes that "we can see that for the whole of the nineteenth century Rousseau was at the heart of the interpretation of the Revolution for both its admirers and its critics."

=== Effect on the American Revolution ===
One of Rousseau's most important American followers was Noah Webster (1758–1843). In 1785, two years before America's constitutional convention, Webster relied heavily on Rousseau's Social Contract while writing Sketches of American Policy, one of the earliest, widely published arguments for a strong central government in America. George Washington, James Madison, and likely other founders read it before the convention. Webster also wrote two "fan-fiction" sequels to Rousseau's Emile, or On Education (1762) and included them in his 1785 Reader for schoolchildren. Webster's 1787 Reader, and later Readers, also contain an idealized word-portrait of Sophie, the girl in Rousseau's Emile, and Webster used Rousseau's theories in Emile to argue for the civic necessity of broad-based female education.

According to some scholars, Rousseau exercised minimal influence on the Founding Fathers of the United States, despite similarities between their ideas. They shared beliefs regarding the self-evidence that "all men are created equal," and the conviction that citizens of a republic be educated at public expense. A parallel can be drawn between the United States Constitution's concept of the "general welfare" and Rousseau's concept of the "general will". Further commonalities exist between Jeffersonian democracy and Rousseau's praise of Switzerland and Corsica's economies of isolated and independent homesteads, and his endorsement of a well-regulated civic militia, such as a navy for Corsica, and the militia of the Swiss cantons.

However, Will and Ariel Durant have opined that Rousseau had a definite political influence on America. According to them:

The first sign of [Rousseau's] political influence was in the wave of public sympathy that supported active French aid to the American Revolution. Jefferson derived the Declaration of Independence from Rousseau as well as from Locke and Montesquieu. As ambassador to France (1785–89) he absorbed much from both Voltaire and Rousseau...The success of the American Revolution raised the prestige of Rousseau's philosophy.

Rousseau's writings perhaps had an indirect influence on American literature through the writings of Wordsworth and Kant, whose works were important to the New England transcendentalist Ralph Waldo Emerson, as well as on Unitarians such as theologian William Ellery Channing. American author James Fenimore Cooper's The Last of the Mohicans, and American novels by other authors reflect republican and egalitarian ideals present alike in Thomas Paine and in English Romantic primitivism. (Note: Cooper was a follower of Tom Paine, who in turn was an admirer of Rousseau. For the classical origins of American ideals of liberty, see also Sibi Imperiosus: Cooper's Horatian Ideal of Self-Governance in The Deerslayer, Villa Julie College, July 2005, archived from the original on 20 October 2017.)

=== Criticisms of Rousseau ===
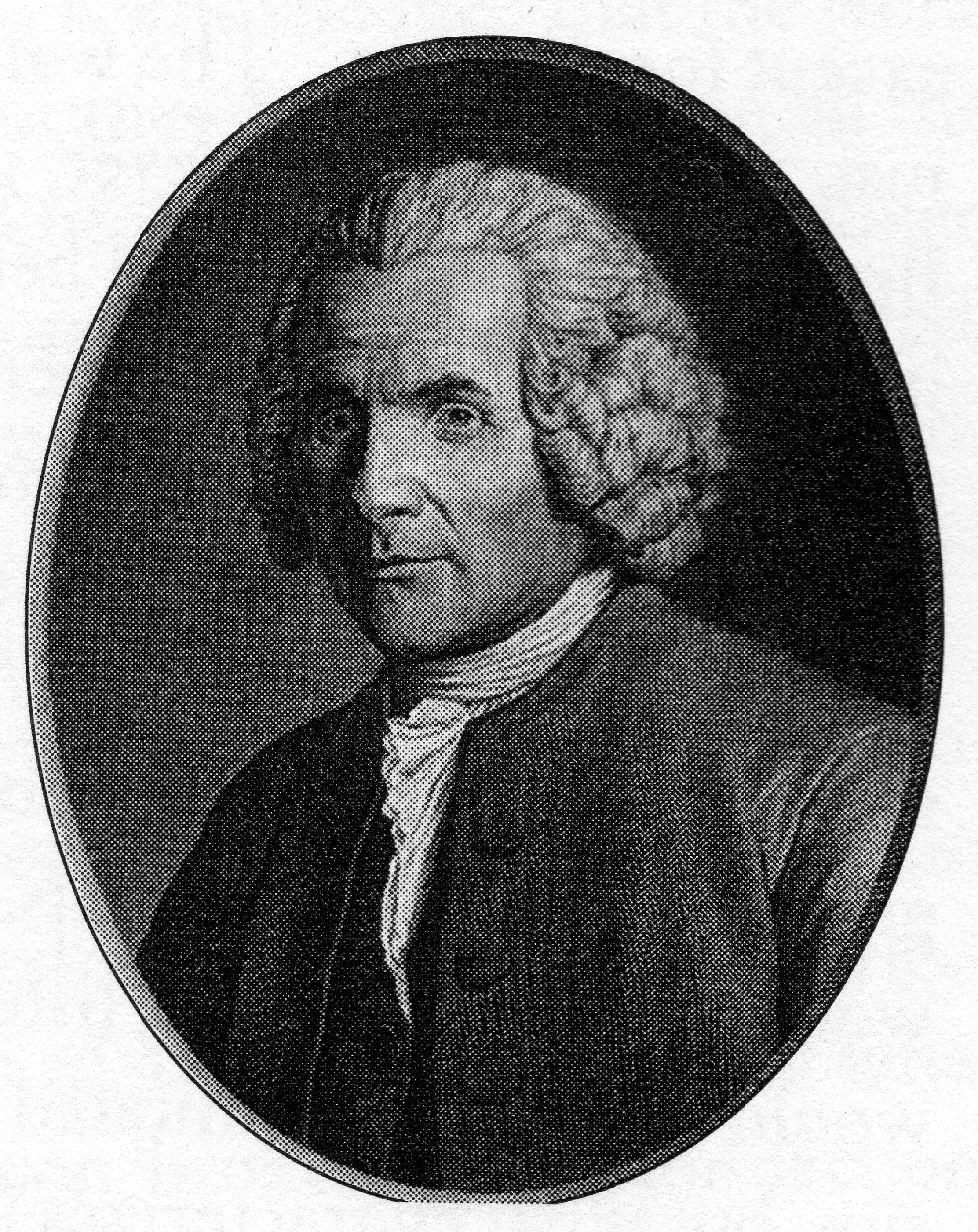
A portrait of Rousseau in later life

The first to criticize Rousseau were his fellow Philosophes, above all, Voltaire. According to Jacques Barzun, Voltaire was annoyed by the first discourse and outraged by the second. Voltaire's reading of the second discourse was that Rousseau would like the reader to "walk on all fours" befitting a savage.

Samuel Johnson told his biographer James Boswell, "I think him one of the worst of men; a rascal, who ought to be hunted out of society, as he has been".

Jean-Baptiste Blanchard was his leading Catholic opponent. Blanchard rejects Rousseau's negative education, in which one must wait until a child has grown to develop reason. The child would find more benefit from learning in his earliest years. He also disagreed with his ideas about female education, declaring that women are a dependent lot. So, removing them from their motherly path is unnatural, as it would lead to the unhappiness of both men and women.

Historian Jacques Barzun states that, contrary to myth, Rousseau was no primitivist; for him:

The model man is the independent farmer, free of superiors and self-governing. This was cause enough for the philosophes' hatred of their former friend. Rousseau's unforgivable crime was his rejection of the graces and luxuries of civilized existence. Voltaire had sung "The superfluous, that most necessary thing." For the high bourgeois standard of living Rousseau would substitute the middling peasant's. It was the country versus the city—an exasperating idea for them, as was the amazing fact that every new work of Rousseau's was a huge success, whether the subject was politics, theater, education, religion, or a novel about love.

As early as 1788, Madame de Staël published her Letters on the works and character of J.-J. Rousseau. In 1819, in his famous speech "On Ancient and Modern Liberty", the political philosopher Benjamin Constant, a proponent of constitutional monarchy and representative democracy, criticized Rousseau, or rather his more radical followers (specifically the Abbé de Mably), for allegedly believing that "everything should give way to collective will, and that all restrictions on individual rights would be amply compensated by participation in social power."

Frédéric Bastiat severely criticized Rousseau in several of his works, most notably in "The Law", in which, after analyzing Rousseau's own passages, he stated that:

And what part do persons play in all this? They are merely the machine that is set in motion. In fact, are they not merely considered to be the raw material of which the machine is made? Thus the same relationship exists between the legislator and the prince as exists between the agricultural expert and the farmer; and the relationship between the prince and his subjects is the same as that between the farmer and his land. How high above mankind, then, has this writer on public affairs been placed?

Bastiat believed that Rousseau wished to ignore forms of social order created by the people—viewing them as a thoughtless mass to be shaped by philosophers. Bastiat, who is considered by thinkers associated with the Austrian School of Economics to be one of the precursors of the "spontaneous order", presented his own vision of what he considered to be the "Natural Order" in a simple economic chain in which multiple parties might interact without necessarily even knowing each other, cooperating and fulfilling each other's needs in accordance with basic economic laws such as supply and demand.

In such a chain, to produce clothing, multiple parties have to act independently—e.g., farmers to fertilize and cultivate land to produce fodder for the sheep, people to shear them, transport the wool, turn it into cloth, and another to tailor and sell it. Those persons engage in economic exchange by nature, and don't need to be ordered to, nor do their efforts need to be centrally coordinated. Such chains are present in every branch of human activity, in which individuals produce or exchange goods and services, and together, naturally create a complex social order that does not require external inspiration, central coordination of efforts, or bureaucratic control to benefit society as a whole.

Bastiat also believed that Rousseau contradicted himself when presenting his views concerning human nature; if nature is "sufficiently invincible to regain its empire", why then would it need philosophers to direct it back to a natural state? Another point of criticism Bastiat raised was that living purely in nature would doom humankind to suffer unnecessary hardships.

The Marquis de Sade's Justine, or the Misfortunes of Virtue (1791) partially parodied and used as inspiration Rousseau's sociological and political concepts in the Discourse on Inequality and The Social Contract. Concepts such as the state of nature, civilization being the catalyst for corruption and evil, and humans "signing" a contract to mutually give up freedoms for the protection of rights, particularly referenced. The Comte de Gernande in Justine, for instance, after Thérèse asks him how he justifies abusing and torturing women, states:

The necessity mutually to render one another happy cannot legitimately exist save between two persons equally furnished with the capacity to do one another hurt and, consequently, between two persons of commensurate strength: such an association can never come into being unless a contract [un pacte] is immediately formed between these two persons, which obligates each to employ against each other no kind of force but what will not be injurious to either. . . [W]hat sort of a fool would the stronger have to be to subscribe to such an agreement?

Edmund Burke formed an unfavorable impression of Rousseau when the latter visited England with Hume and later drew a connection between Rousseau's egoistic philosophy and his personal vanity, saying Rousseau "entertained no principle... but vanity. With this vice he was possessed to a degree little short of madness".

Thomas Carlyle said that Rousseau possessed "the face of what is called a Fanatic . . . his Ideas possessed him like demons". He continued:

The fault and misery of Rousseau was what we easily name by a single word, Egoism . . . He had not perfected himself into victory over mere Desire; a mean Hunger, in many sorts, was still the motive principle of him. I am afraid he was a very vain man; hungry for the praises of men. . . . His Books, like himself, are what I call unhealthy; not the good sort of Books. There is a sensuality in Rousseau. Combined with such an intellectual gift as his, it makes pictures of a certain gorgeous attractiveness: but they are not genuinely poetical. Not white sunlight: something operatic; a kind of rose-pink, artificial bedizenment.

Charles Dudley Warner wrote about Rousseau in his essay, Equality; "Rousseau borrowed from Hobbes as well as from Locke in his conception of popular sovereignty; but this was not his only lack of originality. His discourse on primitive society, his unscientific and unhistoric notions about the original condition of man, were those common in the middle of the eighteenth century."

In 1919, Irving Babbitt, founder of a movement called the "New Humanism", wrote a critique of what he called "sentimental humanitarianism", for which he blamed Rousseau. Babbitt's depiction of Rousseau was countered in a celebrated and much reprinted essay by A.O. Lovejoy in 1923. In France, conservative theorist Charles Maurras, founder of Action Française, "had no compunctions in laying the blame for both Romantisme et Révolution firmly on Rousseau in 1922."

During the Cold War, Rousseau was criticized for his association with nationalism and its attendant abuses, for example in Jacob Leib Talmon (1952), The Origins of Totalitarian Democracy. (Note: Talmon's thesis is rebutted by Leigh, Ralph A (1963), "Liberté et autorité dans le Contrat Social", Jean-Jacques Rousseau et son oeuvre [Jean-Jacques Rousseau & his work] (in French), Paris: s.n.. Another tenacious proponent of the totalitarian thesis was Crocker, Lester C (1968), Rousseau's Social Contract, An interpretive Essay, Cleveland: Case Western Reserve Press. Two reviews of the debate are: Chapman, J.W. (1968), Rousseau: Totalitarian or Liberal?, New York: AMS Press and Fralin, Richard (1978), Rousseau and Representation, NY: Columbia University Press.) This came to be known among scholars as the "totalitarian thesis". Political scientist J.S. Maloy states that "the twentieth century added Nazism and Stalinism to Jacobinism on the list of horrors for which Rousseau could be blamed. ... Rousseau was considered to have advocated just the sort of invasive tampering with human nature which the totalitarian regimes of mid-century had tried to instantiate." But he adds that "The totalitarian thesis in Rousseau studies has, by now, been discredited as an attribution of real historical influence."

Arthur Melzer, while conceding that Rousseau would not have approved of modern nationalism, observes that his theories do contain the "seeds of nationalism", insofar as they set forth the "politics of identification", which are rooted in sympathetic emotion. Melzer believes that in admitting that people's talents are unequal, Rousseau therefore tacitly condones the tyranny of the few over the many. For Stephen T. Engel, Rousseau's nationalism anticipated modern theories of "imagined communities" that transcend social and religious divisions within states.

On similar grounds, one of Rousseau's strongest critics during the second half of the 20th century was political philosopher Hannah Arendt. Using Rousseau's thought as an example, Arendt identified the notion of sovereignty with that of the general will. According to her, it was this desire to establish a single, unified will based on the stifling of opinion in favor of public passion that contributed to the excesses of the French Revolution.

=== Appreciation and influence ===
The book Rousseau and Revolution, by Will and Ariel Durant, begins with the following words about Rousseau:

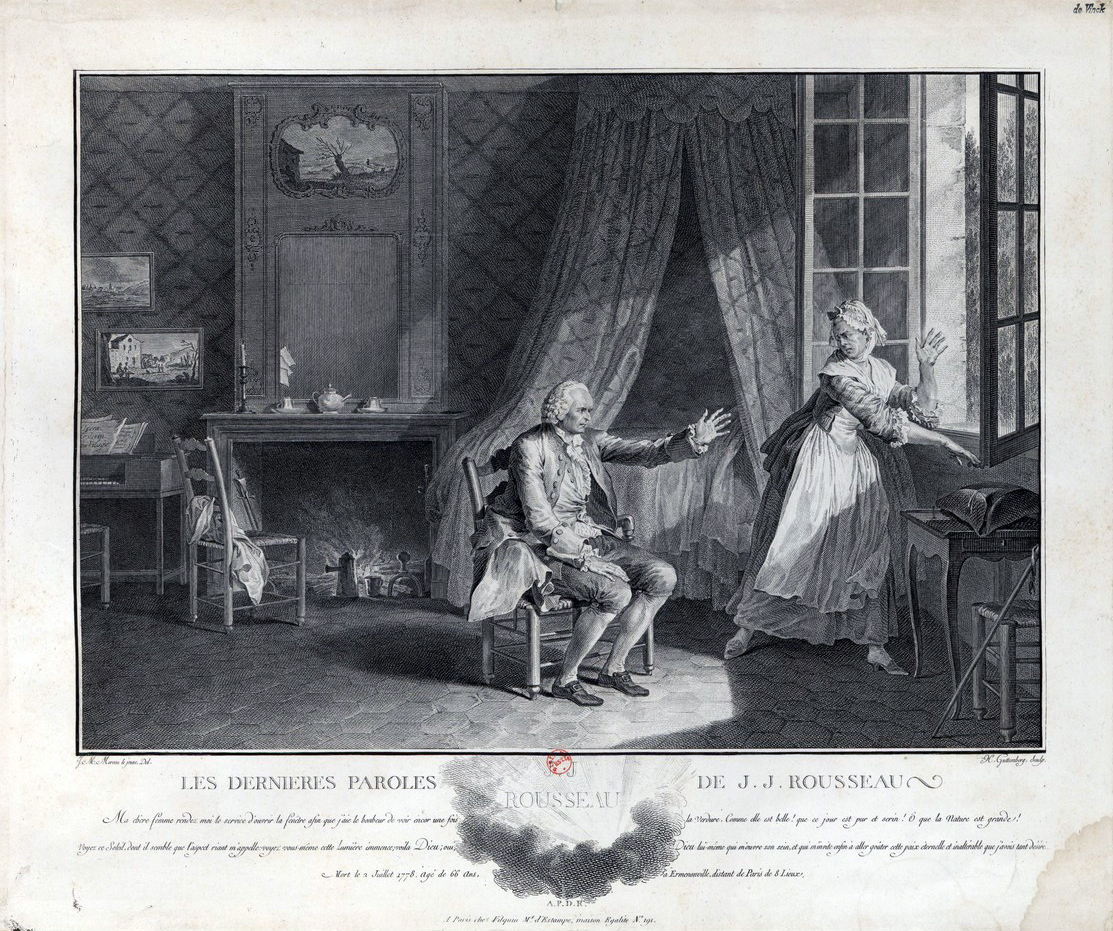
Les dernières paroles de Jean-Jacques Rousseau

How did it come about that a man born poor, losing his mother at birth and soon deserted by his father, afflicted with a painful and humiliating disease, left to wander for twelve years among alien cities and conflicting faiths, repudiated by society and civilization, repudiating Voltaire, Diderot, the Encyclopédie and the Age of Reason, driven from place to place as a dangerous rebel, suspected of crime and insanity, and seeing, in his last months, the apotheosis of his greatest enemy—how did it come about that this man, after his death, triumphed over Voltaire, revived religion, transformed education, elevated the morals of France, inspired the Romantic movement and the French Revolution, influenced the philosophy of Kant and Schopenhauer, the plays of Schiller, the novels of Goethe, the poems of Wordsworth, Byron and Shelley, the socialism of Marx, the ethics of Tolstoy and, altogether, had more effect upon posterity than any other writer or thinker of that eighteenth century in which writers were more influential than they had ever been before?

The German writers Goethe, Schiller, and Herder have stated that Rousseau's writings inspired them. Herder regarded Rousseau to be his "guide", and Schiller compared Rousseau to Socrates. Goethe, in 1787, stated: "Emile and its sentiments had a universal influence on the cultivated mind." The elegance of Rousseau's writing is held to have inspired a significant transformation in French poetry and drama—freeing them from rigid literary norms.

Other writers who were influenced by Rousseau's writings included Leopardi in Italy; Pushkin and Tolstoy in Russia; Wordsworth, Southey, Coleridge, Byron, Shelley, Keats, and Blake in England; and Hawthorne and Thoreau in America. According to Tolstoy: "At sixteen I carried around my neck, instead of the usual cross, a medallion with Rousseau's portrait."

Rousseau's Discourse on the Arts and Sciences, emphasizing individualism and repudiating "civilization", was appreciated by, among others, Thomas Paine, William Godwin, Shelley, Tolstoy, and Edward Carpenter. Rousseau's contemporary Voltaire appreciated the section in Emile titled Profession of Faith of the Savoyard Vicar.

Despite his criticisms, Carlyle admired Rousseau's sincerity: "with all his drawbacks, and they are many, he has the first and chief characteristic of a Hero: he is heartily in earnest. In earnest, if ever man was; as none of these French Philosophers were." He also admired his repudiation of atheism:

Strangely through all that defacement, degradation and almost madness, there is in the inmost heart of poor Rousseau a spark of real heavenly fire. Once more, out of the element of that withered mocking Philosophism, Scepticism and Persiflage, there has arisen in this man the ineradicable feeling and knowledge that this Life of ours is true: not a Scepticism, Theorem, or Persiflage, but a Fact, an awful Reality. Nature had made that revelation to him; had ordered him to speak it out. He got it spoken out; if not well and clearly, then ill and dimly,—as clearly as he could.

Modern admirers of Rousseau include John Dewey and Claude Lévi-Strauss. According to Matthew Josephson, Rousseau has remained controversial for more than two centuries, and has continued to gain admirers and critics down to the present time. (Note: "For more than two centuries since Rousseau's writings were first published, controversy over the man and his ideas has continued virtually unabated. In their diverse ways his admirers and his opponents both have affirmed his importance in world history: the supporting party has seen him as the Friend of Man, the prophet of the new democratic ages that were to come after him, and one of the fathers of the French Revolution; his antagonists have pronounced him as a dangerous heretic who scorned organized religion, and as the inspirer of romanticism in literature and an unbridled libertarianism in politics. Indeed, they have somehow attributed to him the origin of many of the alleged evils of modern times, ranging from the restiveness of 'hippie' youth to the rigors of totalitarian societies. However, those who have tried to judge Rousseau fairly have generally agreed that among the philosophical writers of his century he was the one who stated the problem of civilization with more clarity and force than any of his contemporaries ... His works as a moralist and political philosopher influenced and fascinated minds as different as those of Hume, Kant, Goethe, Byron, Schiller, and, in recent times, the American behaviorist philosopher John Dewey. New opponents of conservative bias have continued to write against him in the present century, but he has also won new admirers, such as the great French anthropologist Claude Lévi-Strauss."—Matthew Josephson, in his introduction to The Essential Rousseau)

== Works ==
=== Major works ===
- Dissertation sur la musique moderne, 1743
- Discourse on the Arts and Sciences (Discours sur les sciences et les arts), 1750
- Narcissus, or The Self-Admirer: A Comedy, 1752
- Discourse on the Origin and Basis of Inequality Among Men (Discours sur l'origine et les fondements de l'inégalité parmi les hommes), 1754
- Letter on French Music, 1753 (Lettre sur la musique française)
- Discourse on Political Economy, 1755 (Discours sur l'économie politique)
- Letter to M. D'Alembert on Spectacles, 1758 (Lettre à D'Alembert sur les spectacles)
- Julie; or, The New Heloise (Julie ou la nouvelle Héloïse), 1761
- Emile or On Education (Émile ou de l'éducation), 1762 (includes "The Creed of a Savoyard Priest")
- The Social Contract, or Principles of Political Right (Du contrat social), 1762
- Four Letters to M. de Malesherbes, 1762
- Letters Written from the Mountain, 1764 (Lettres écrites de la montagne)
- Dictionary of Music. 1767 (Dictionnaire de la musique)
- Confessions of Jean-Jacques Rousseau (Les Confessions), 1770, published 1782
- Constitutional Project for Corsica, 1765, published 1768
- Considerations on the Government of Poland, 1772
- Letters on the Elements of Botany
- Essay on the Origin of Languages, published 1781 (Essai sur l'origine des langues)
- Rousseau Judge of Jean-Jacques, published 1782 (Rousseau juge de Jean-Jacques)
- Reveries of the Solitary Walker, incomplete, published 1782 (Rêveries du promeneur solitaire)

=== Editions in English ===
- Basic Political Writings, trans. Donald A. Cress. Indianapolis: Hackett, 1987.
- Collected Writings, ed. Roger Masters and Christopher Kelly, Dartmouth: University Press of New England, 1990–2010, 13 vols.
- The Confessions, trans. Angela Scholar. Oxford: Oxford University Press, 2000.
- Émile or On Education, trans. with an introd. by Allan Bloom, New York: Basic Books, 1979.
- "On the Origin of Language", trans. John H. Moran. In On the Origin of Language: Two Essays. Chicago: University of Chicago Press, 1986.
- Reveries of a Solitary Walker, trans. Peter France. London: Penguin Books, 1980.
- 'The Discourses' and Other Early Political Writings, trans. Victor Gourevitch. Cambridge: Cambridge University Press, 1997.
- 'The Social Contract' and Other Later Political Writings, trans. Victor Gourevitch. Cambridge: Cambridge University Press, 1997.
- 'The Social Contract, trans. Maurice Cranston. Penguin: Penguin Classics Various Editions, 1968–2007.
- The Political writings of Jean-Jacques Rousseau, edited with introduction and notes by C.E.Vaughan, Blackwell, Oxford, 1962. (In French but the introduction and notes are in English).
- Rousseau on Women, Love, and Family, Christopher Kelly and Eve Grace (eds.), Dartmouth College Press, 2009.

== See also ==
- Boustrophedon
- Château de Chenonceau
- Eat the rich, a saying attributed to Rousseau
- Georges Hébert, a physical culturist influenced by Rousseau's teachings
- Let them eat cake, a saying of Rousseau's
- List of abolitionist forerunners
- List of political systems in France
- Rousseau Institute
- Rousseau's educational philosophy
- Schutterij – civil militia

=== Sources ===
- Babbitt, Irving (1991) [1919], Rousseau and Romanticism, Library of Conservative Thought, Edison, New Jersey: Transaction.
- Barzun, Jacques (2001). From Dawn to Decadence: 500 Years of Western Cultural Life: 1500 to the Present. London: HarperCollins. ISBN 978-0007113828. Archived from the original on 19 April 2021.
- Bastiat, Frédéric (2010). The Law. New York: Cosimo Classics. ISBN 978-1616403775. Archived from the original on 19 April 2021.
- Bertram, Christopher (2012). Zalta, Edward N. (ed.). The Stanford Encyclopedia of Philosophy (Winter 2012 ed.). Metaphysics Research Lab, Stanford University. Archived from the original on 18 March 2019.
- Blackwood, William (1842). "Protestantism in Geneva". Blackwood's Magazine. 51. Archived from the original on 19 April 2021.
- Cranston, Maurice (2005), The Solitary Self, Chicago, Illinois: University of Chicago Press.
- Damrosch, Leo (2005). Jean-Jacques Rousseau: Restless Genius. New York: Houghton Mifflin Harcourt. p. 566. ISBN 978-0618446964..
- Durant, Will; Durant, Ariel (1967). The Story of Civilization: Rousseau and revolution; a history of civilization in France, England, and Germany from 1756, and in the remainder of Europe from 1715 to 1789. Vol. 10. Simon & Schuster. p. 1091. ISBN 978-0671219888. Archived from the original on 3 August 2020.
- Einaudi, Mario (1968). Early Rousseau. Ithaca: Cornell University Press.
- Ellingson, Ter (2001). The Myth of the Noble Savage. Berkeley: University of California Press.
- Gay, Peter (1977). The Enlightenment: An Interpretation. New York: Norton. ISBN 0393008703. Archived from the original on 19 April 2021.
- Grimm, Friedrich Melchior Freiherr von (1815). Historical & Literary Memoirs and Anecdotes, Selected from the Correspondence of Baron de Grimm and Diderot with the Duke of Saxe-Gotha, and Many Other Distinguished Persons, Between the Years of 1753 and 1790. Vol. 4. Translated by Bland, Robert; Plumptre, Anne. London: Henry Colburn. Archived from the original on 19 April 2021.
- Israel, Jonathan I. (2002). Radical Enlightenment: Philosophy and the Making of Modernity. Oxford University Press.
- Li, Hansong (2020). "Timing the Laws: Rousseau's Theory of Development in Corsica". European Journal of the History of Economic Thought. 29 (4): 648–679. doi:10.1080/09672567.2022.2063357. S2CID 251137139.
- Lovejoy, Arthur O. (1948) [1923]. "The Supposed Primitivism of Rousseau's 'Discourse on Inequality'". Modern Philology. XXI: 165–186.. Reprinted in Essays in the History of Ideas (Baltimore: Johns Hopkins Press). "A classic treatment of the Second Discourse" – Nicholas Dent.
- Musset-Pathay, Victor Donatien de (1821). Histoire de la vie et des ouvrages de J.-J. Rousseau (in French). Vol. 1. Paris: Pélicier. Archived from the original on 19 April 2021.
- Rosenblatt, Helena (1997). Rousseau and Geneva: From the First Discourse to The Social Contract, 1749–1762. Cambridge: Cambridge University Press. ISBN 978-0521570046. Archived from the original on 19 April 2021.
- Rousseau, Jean-Jacques (1796) [1782]. The Confessions of J.J. Rousseau, Citizen of Geneva: Part the First. To which are Added, The Reveries of a Solitary Walker. Vol. 1 (3rd ed.). London: G.G. and J. Robinson. Archived from the original on 19 April 2021.
- Rousseau, Jean-Jacques (1856). Oeuvres complètes de J.J. Rousseau: avec des notes historiques [Complete works of J.J. Rousseau: with historical notes] (in French). Vol. 11. Frankfurt on the Main: Heinrich Hirsch Bechhold. Archived from the original on 19 April 2021.
- Rousseau, Jean-Jacques (1861). The Confessions of Jean-Jacques Rousseau. Reeves and Turner. Archived from the original on 31 March 2019.
- Rousseau, Jean-Jacques (1903). The Confessions of Jean Jacques Rousseau: Now First Completely Translated into English. Vol. 1. London: Aldus Society. Archived from the original on 19 April 2021.
- Rousseau, Jean-Jacques (1987), Confessions, Cambridge University Press, ISBN 978-0521315005
- Snyder, R. Claire (1999). Citizen-Soldiers and Manly Warriors: Military Service and Gender in the Civic Republican Tradition. Vol. 1. Lanham, Maryland: Rowman & Littlefield Publishers. ISBN 978-0742573536. Archived from the original on 19 April 2021.
- Wokler, Robert (2001). Rousseau: A Very Short Introduction. Oxford: Oxford University Press. ISBN 978-0192801982. Archived from the original on 14 August 2021.
