= Nicholas Dent =

British political philosopher

- Spouse: Stephanie Gaunt

Education
- Education: University of Cambridge (PhD)

Philosophical work
- Era: 21st-century philosophy
- Region: Western philosophy
- Institutions: University of Birmingham

Nicholas John Henry Dent (born 1945) is a British philosopher and emeritus professor of philosophy at the University of Birmingham. He is best known for his work on Rousseau's thought.

== Books ==
- The Moral Psychology of the Virtues (1984)
- Rousseau: An Introduction to his Psychological, Social and Political Theory (1988)
- The Rousseau Dictionary (1992)
- Rousseau (2005)
