= Dialogues: Rousseau, Judge of Jean-Jacques =

Autobiography by Rousseau

Rousseau, Judge of Jean-Jacques (French: Rousseau juge de Jean-Jacques) is a book written by Jean-Jacques Rousseau. In this book, Rousseau responds to what he calls slanderous and defamatory attacks on his reputation by his enemies.

Rousseau began writing Rousseau, Judge of Jean-Jacques in 1772, completing it in 1776. The book is in the form of three dialogues between a "Frenchman" and "Rousseau". The two characters argue the merits and demerits of a third character, an author called "Jean-Jacques".

Rousseau, Judge of Jean-Jacques has been described as Rousseau's most unreadable work; in the book's foreword, he concedes that it might be repetitious and disorderly, but begs the reader's indulgence on the ground that he needs to defend his reputation from slander while he is still alive.
