= Letter to M. d'Alembert on Spectacles =

1758 essay by Jean-Jacques Rousseau

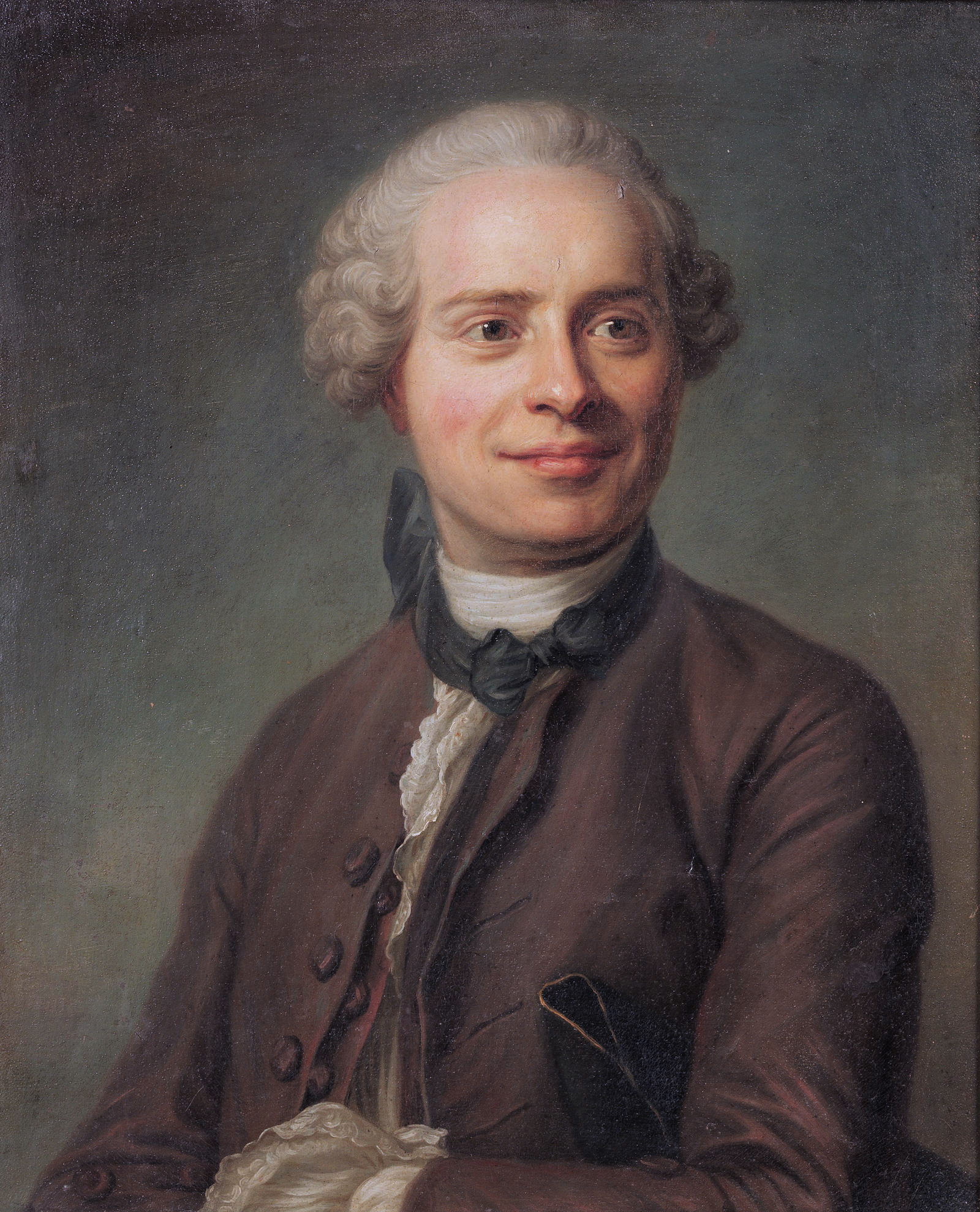
Jean d'Alembert

Letter to M. d'Alembert on Spectacles (French: Lettre à M. d'Alembert sur les spectacles) is a 1758 essay written by Jean-Jacques Rousseau in opposition to an article published in the Encyclopédie by Jean d'Alembert that proposed the establishment of a theatre in Geneva. More generally, it is a critical analysis of the effects of culture on morals, that clarifies the links between politics and social life. Rousseau relates the issue of a theatre in Geneva to the broader social context, warning of the potential the theatre has to corrupt the morality in society.

The Letter is considered to be highly personally relevant to Rousseau, whose patriotism and affinity for Geneva shows through as he writes to defend his country from moral decay. By focusing on his belief in the natural order and harmony of traditional sex roles and community, Rousseau writes to convince d'Alembert, and the public of Geneva, that a theatre is a threat to an ideal, natural way of life.

== Historical context ==
Rousseau generally opposed the Enlightenment thrust that was occurring during his lifetime. He sought to distance himself philosophically from the views that the universal use of reason, science, uninhibited freedom of thought, and an increasing appreciation for the fine arts would make society a better place. Rousseau is often characterized as the father of Romanticism, as he opposed modernity and the Enlightenment and glorified the heroic ethos of Ancient Rome and Greece.

The trend of the Enlightenment among philosophers, since Descartes and Spinoza, was to move towards a society with minimized restrictions. Rousseau adhered to the belief that restrictions and censorship are often justified to maintain civil order. Ecclesiastical groups as well, namely the Jansenists, harshly condemned the theatre due to it being incompatible with Christian morality. However, after the death of Louis XIV, new philosophical ideas began to emerge about embracing earthly pleasure, and the theatre found more and more supporters. It may be important to note that the theatre was a far more powerful cultural force in Rousseau's day than today. D'Alembert's article in support of the theatre was influenced by Voltaire, who not only was against censorship, but frequently put on theatrical performances at his home outside of Geneva.

== Synopsis ==
The Letter begins by Rousseau establishing the respect he has for his friend D'Alembert. But after quoting a passage from D'Alembert's letter, Rousseau writes that it is imperative to discuss the potential disasters that a theatre could bring. He also responds to some comments D'Alembert makes praising the tolerance of the Geneva clergy while criticizing the intolerance of French Roman Catholicism. Rousseau is, however, reluctant to engage this discussion in depth.

The main letter is divided into three general areas: "A) The Theatre in Relation to What Is Performed in It"; "B) The Theatre Considered in Relation to the Stage and Actors"; and "C) The Establishment of a Theatre in Geneva".

=== The theatre in relation to what is performed in it ===
Rousseau writes that the theatre, at first glance, is a form of amusement. Amusements are acceptable in moderation, when they are necessary, but they become a burden if they consume the minds of men enough to waste their time. The principle of the theatre is to please, it is not, Rousseau argues, functional because the characters are always distant from man. If the play is a comedy, for example, the content is undermined, and if it is tragic, the heroic ideals are exaggerated and placed out of the reach of man. Even if the play happens to portray moral ideals well, the awareness of the audience that it is a fiction does not do the ideas justice.

Rousseau continues to say that though Greek and Roman society functioned well with tragic and violent content in theatres because it was part of the traditions specific to the time and place, putting these plays in a French context would be far more dangerous. However, tragedies are not as dangerous as comedies, because the characters more closely resemble French citizens.

He extensively discusses playwright Molière's work, and uses the play Le Misanthrope to exemplify a comedy in which the audience derives immoral pleasure. In the play, the main character, Alceste, is good and honest in his relationships with men and made to look ridiculous, whereas Philinte, a deceiver and manipulator, is shown as superior. Rousseau considers this play to be a work of genius, but it is, of course, morally backwards. He reasons that even if comedy writers write a play that is morally acceptable, the audience will not find it funny. Therefore, theatres are of little use.

Rousseau turns to the topic of love, which, he says, is in the realm of women. Women naturally have power over men via resistance in the area of relationships and this power can be extended to the play, where women can have the same control over the audience. This extension of the empire of women is against the natural order. Rousseau refers to ancient Sparta, where the most virtuous and appreciated women were those who were modest and generally not spoken about. In the decadence of France, Rousseau claims the most esteemed woman is the one who is most social, most talked about, judgmental and authoritative.

=== The theatre considered in relation to the stage and actors ===
Even if the theatre is morally innocuous, Rousseau argues, its presence is disruptive to potentially productive use of time. Moreover, theatre is incompatible with the rural mindset, where people work hard, and as a result should find simple relaxation pleasurable, rather than the extravagant, over-stimulating entertainment which retards the imagination. A theatre in Geneva would cause the hardworking people to be distracted and pre-occupied if they were to develop a taste for it. Though a theatre can work to distract the masses of the cities from crime, it is of no use to a smaller city like Geneva, which is relatively innocent. Rousseau also describes the weather and geography of Geneva, and argues that it is not particularly conducive to supporting a theatre.

If a theatre is established it will change the maxims and prejudices of Geneva, for better or worse, and the best way to deal with this is simply prevention, Rousseau argues. In other words, it is easier to not have to deal with corrupted morality and have to change the laws accordingly.

In this section, Rousseau expresses his belief that actors and actresses themselves are people of an undesirable lifestyle and potentially weak moral foundation. Rousseau describes them as scandalous, hedonistic, and compares them to jesters, who were more blatantly indecent and obscene. Once again looking to Greece and Rome as an ideal, he says that Sparta did not tolerate theatres, and Rome considered the acting profession dishonourable. He writes that the actor is someone who is artificial, performs for money, subjects himself to disgrace, and abandons his role as a man. Though the actor is not necessarily malevolent with his talents of deception, Rousseau goes on, the seductive, manipulative nature of acting could potentially be used by actors to do harm in society outside of the theatre. It is also problematic, according to Rousseau for women and men to be working together as actors and actresses. Because of the natural respect men have for the moral sense and timidity of women, for men to be amongst women as actresses will be a further threat to men's morality.

=== The establishment of a theatre at Geneva ===
Rousseau portrays Geneva in a very romantic and positive light, where people are productive, happy and hard at work, but he also recognizes the extreme wealth and poverty in the city. He first tries to sway Geneva away from the idea of theatre by suggesting that it is not economically feasible, and that the population is too low to support a theatre.

He goes on to criticize women's social activity in public and private venues in Paris and Geneva, suggesting women produce the only gossip, and the moral decay of men, women and children. He states that though men have their vices, like drinking, they are far less harmful to society than women's vices. He argues that the presence and authority of women in public spaces corrupts the male youth, turning them effeminate and void of patriotic passion. Once again, the morality of Ancient Rome and Greece is frequently referenced as an ideal that should be aspired to.

Towards the middle of this final section Rousseau reasons that the theatre does very little good for the poor, who cannot afford the taxes required to support a theatre. Geneva, which already has a large degree of inequality, does not need any more. Rousseau continues to say that actors coming to the town of Geneva will be indifferent to the town's morality, and will quickly corrupt it. Even though there are other forms of entertainment in Geneva that exemplify bad manners, Rousseau claims that none of these areas are more destructive to the people's good taste than the theatre. The best alternative to theatres is open-air festivals, in nature, to provide a unifying, patriotic spirit.

== Rousseau's style and personality ==
In spite of the letter being addressed directly to D'Alembert, it was undoubtedly addressed to the general population. The work is famous for displaying Rousseau's charismatic rhetoric and digressive tendencies, all with his personal experience woven into the text. It may be considered to portray Rousseau's vanity, narcissism, and biases, but the text could also be thought of more positively, as expressive, lyrical, and austere. The Letter shows Rousseau's tendency to think of the events in his own life as highly significant, as reflections of the larger social picture. For example, the Letter is open and expressive in style, while the content of the Letter is about this openness.

The Letter starts off with a grim and urgent tone, then shifts at the end to a brighter and optimistic one when it discusses the community-oriented solution to the problem of the theatre.

== Reception ==
D'Alembert himself was moved by the response, even intimidated. With impartiality, he decided it fit for publication (he himself at one time worked as a censor). Rousseau and D'Alembert managed to maintain their friendship after the response, though somewhat at a distance. The letter attracted remarkable attention; over four hundred articles and pamphlets were written in response to it. Overall, the population of Geneva agreed with the Letter.

== Social and political themes ==
Rousseau believed that the theatre took people away from the community, and replaced any patriotic, unifying spirit with artificial emotions. To have a prosperous state, Rousseau believed, people needed to work together and harmoniously. As an alternative to the theatre, Rousseau proposed open-air republican festivals, with a rich community atmosphere. One of Rousseau's pivotal points in the Letter is that customs, opinions and priorities which are common and well-accepted among all citizens should be those that make accepting laws in favour of respect, equality and harmony a pleasurable and natural experience. In other words, people have to share the concerns with legislators if a state is to be successful.

== Women and the family ==
In the Letter, Rousseau rejected the traditional notion of male politicians being responsible for moral reform, which he thought was women's responsibility. He considered women, by virtue of their nature, to be the primary agents of moral reform, and that the success of the state depends on the harmony within private, domestic life. Rousseau opposed marriage without love (i.e., marriage for financial reasons, order, lust, or convenience). In Rousseau's opinion, true love for the nurturing, feminine mother, instead of lustful love for a mistress, goes hand in hand with patriotism and civic harmony. The legislator's task is to make sure a society's women maintain order.

Rousseau believed that public morals could be created not by laws or punishment, but simply by women, who have access to their senses and largely control the way men think. He praised Geneva for its moral women and its ordered familial sphere, while criticizing the women of the salons in France for making men womanly and cowardly.

== Present-day relevance ==
Post-modern thinking has shown a renewed interest and appreciation for Rousseau's Letter to M. D'Alembert on Spectacles, with the acceptance since Rousseau's time of utopian and primitivist elements in political thought. Rousseau's letter can help to understand the distinction between lived-in culture and theoretical political order. Rousseau's views on the theatre are also thought to echo current concerns with global entertainment, television, and the Internet replacing local customs and culture.
