= Jacob Vernet =

Genevan theologian (1698–1789)

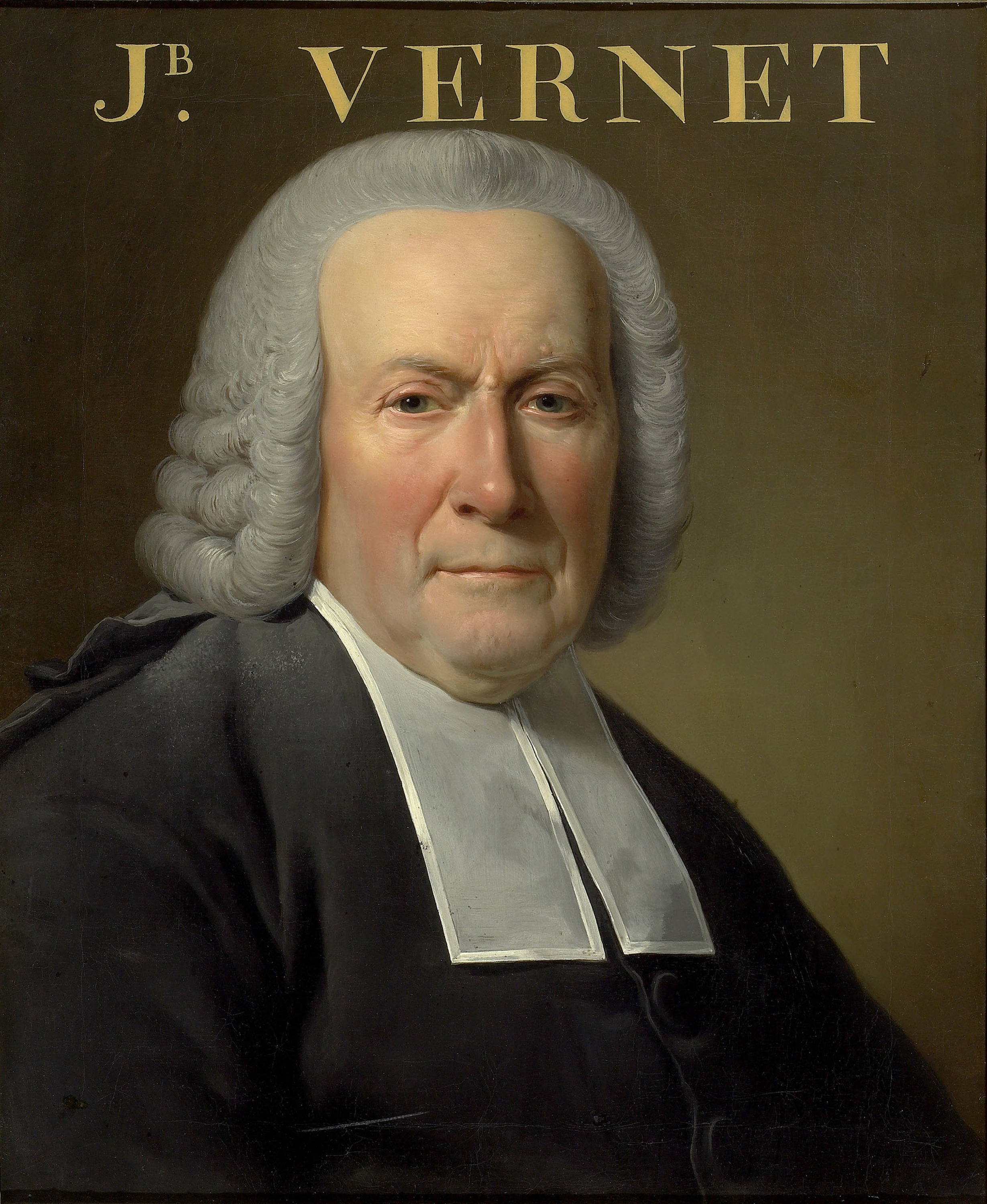

Jacob Vernet (29 August 1698, in Geneva – 26 March 1789, in Geneva) was a prominent theologian in Geneva, Republic of Geneva, who believed in a rationalist approach to religion. He was called "the most important and influential Genevan pastor of his day".

== Life ==
Vernet was born in 1698. He was taught by Jean-Alphonse Turrettini, and was consecrated as a pastor in 1722. In 1722 he went to Paris as tutor for the children of a wealthy family, a post he held for nine years, and it was here that he entered into discussions with the French philosophes.

In 1728 he took his charge to Italy, where he met Lodovico Muratori, Montesquieu and the economist John Law, and to Holland where he met several of the Collegialists and Jean Barbeyrac, a prominent advocate of Moderation.

Vernet returned to Geneva in 1730 to become pastor of a parish in Jussy. He became the tutor of Turrentin's son, whom he took on a tour in 1732 of Switzerland, Germany, Holland, England and France. In Marburg he met the philosopher Christian Wolff, later describing him as someone "who inspired moderation in his disciples". He was impressed in the four months he spent in England by the moderation in religion and freedom in government that he found in that country. Back in Geneva, Vernet became pastor at St. Pierre and St. Gervais in 1734, and rector of the academy in 1737.

In 1739 he became a professor of Belles Lettres, and in 1756 a professor of Theology. Vernet was close to the highest levels of government in Geneva. In 1734 he published "Relation des affaires de Geneve", strongly biased towards the patrician regime that governed the city, praising them for their concern to do good for the public and their wise administration of finances. He did not believe that the people needed to control the government to be free, as long as government was placed in good hands.

== Voltaire and Rousseau ==
Vernet first met Voltaire in Paris in 1733, and entered into a correspondence in which they discussed publication of Voltaire's works in Geneva. After Voltaire moved to Geneva in 1754, the two men soon quarrelled over several subjects, and as the controversy became public the Syndics were involved in moderating the dispute. When D'Alembert visited Geneva to collect material for an encyclopedia article on the city, he stayed with Voltaire, but was assisted by Vernet who provided much material on the city's history and government.

In 1754 Rousseau wrote to Vernet about being readmitted to the church of Geneva. In 1758 Vernet praised Rousseau for recognizing that "in a state constitution everything is connected". When a controversy arose over D'Alembert's article on Geneva, Rousseau supported Geneva's pastors. The article suggested that the Geneva clergymen including Vernet, Jacob Vernes and others had moved from Calvinism to pure Socinianism. The Pastors of Geneva were indignant, and appointed a committee to answer these charges. Under pressure, d'Alembert eventually made the excuse that he considered anyone who did not accept the Church of Rome to be a Socinianist, and that was all he meant. The relationship with Rousseau broke down when Rousseau published his Contrat Social and his attack on revealed religion in Emile: or, On Education, both in 1762. Vernet played a leading role in having both these works condemned in Geneva.

== Beliefs ==
Vernet was inspired by Descartes's philosophy, English moderation and Arminian theology. Searching for a middle way between extremes, he wrote that "the middle way ... constitutes the true religion". Vernet followed Turretin's approach of advocating reasonable faith, and felt that no aspect of theology should be objectionable to a Deist or Atheist. He refused to speculate over mysteries such as predestination, reprobation or the nature of the Trinity. His major work was a French edition of Turrentin's Latin theses on the Christian religion, which is designed to show that the faith is aligned with reason. He considered that a "heathen in Africa" could be saved without ever hearing of Christ if he responded to the revelation that God had given him in his nature and his conscience.

Vernet believed that God wanted man to obey the Creator and do good of his own free will, and thought that the path to virtue was open to everyone. In his "Instruction chretienne", intended as a theological primer, he attempted to present a simplified view of the faith and thus reduce dissent between different sects. He was against the precision of Reformed scholasticism, which he felt led to divisions. He said that the major goal of the truly religious person was to honor God as the supreme and infinitely wise master of the universe, and in the process religion would lead to personal happiness. He did not however consider that the choice of one's religion was unimportant, since he felt that only Christianity was based on reasonable standards.

== Bibliography ==
- Jacob Vernet (1727). Défense des deux lettres adressées à Mr. *** chanoine de Notre Dame ... sur le mandement de Monseigr. le cardinal de Noailles, au sujet de la guérison de la dame de la Fosse: contre la Réponse d'un docteur de Sorbone du diocèse d'Annecy.
- Nicolas Malebranche; Jacob Vernet; Pierre Varignon (1730). Pièces fugitives sur l'Eucharistie.
- Pietro Giannone; Jacob Vernet (1738). Anecdotes Ecclesiastiques: La Police and La Discipline de L'Eglise Chretienne.
- Jean-Alphonse Turrettini; Jacob Vernet (1740). Traité de la vérité de la religion chrétienne, Part 4. Chez Henri-Albert Gosse & Comp.
- Jacob Vernet (1740). De humaniorum literarum amoenitate et usu oratio inaug.
- Charles-Louis de Secondat de Montesquieu; Jacob Vernet (1748). De l'esprit des loix: ou du rapport que les loix doivent avoir avec la constitution de chaque gouvernement, les moeurs, le climat, la religion, le commerce, etc. chez Barrillot et fils.
- Jacob Vernet (1752). Lettres sur la coutume moderne d'employer le "vous" au lieu du "tu": et sur cette question: doit-on bannir le "tutoyement" de nos versions, particulièrement de celles de la Bible?. D. Aillaud.
- Jacob Vernet (1754). Instruction chrétienne. Aux dépens d'une Société de Gens de Lettres.
- Jacob Vernet (1756). Dialogues socratiques ou entretiens sur divers sujets de morale.
- Jacob Vernet (1759). Dialogues on some important subjects: drawn up after the manner of Socrates, for the use of His Serene Highness the prince of Saxegotha. Translation by Archibald Maclaine. Ewing.
- Jacob Vernet (1766). Lettres critiques d'un voyageur anglois sur l'article Genève du Dictionnaire encyclopédique, et sur la lettre de Mr d'Alembert à Mr Rousseau touchant les spectacles. A l'enseigne de la Vérité.
- Louis Jean; Lévesque de Pouilly; Jacob Vernet (1766). The theory of agreeable sensations: In which, after the laws observed by nature in the distribution of pleasure are discovered, he principles of natural theology, and moral philosophy are established. To which is subjoined, relative to the same subject, a dissertation upon harmony of style. Printed for J. Dickson.
- Jacob Vernet; Voltaire (1767). Mémoire présenté à Mr le premier sindic par Jacob Vernet sur un libelle qui le concerne: avec la lettre curieuse de Robert Covelle ... à la louange de M. V. ... à laquelle le mémoire sert de réponse. J. Bosch.
- Jacob Vernet (1769). Réflexions sur les moeurs, la religion et le culte. chez Claude Philibert & Bart. Chirol.
- Jacob Vernet (1770). 7 theses seu Commentationes theologicae.
- Jacob Vernet; N. Cheveniere (1784). Commentatio ... in totum caput Paulinum 1 Corinth. XV. Maxime autem circa introitum mortis in mundum.
- Jacob Vernet (1784). Jacobi Verneti, Theologiae In Academia Genevensi Professoris Selecta Opuscula.

Academic offices
Preceded by Antoine Maurice, I (fr); Louis Tronchin (II)	Chair of theology at the Genevan Academy; 1756-1786; With: Louis Tronchin (II)(1756); Antoine Maurice, II (fr) (1756-1786); Jacques-André Trembley (1756-1763); David Claparède (1763-1786)	Succeeded by Antoine Maurice, II (fr); David Claparède
