= People are the masters of their own country =

Chinese Communist Party slogan

People are the masters of their own country (Chinese: 人民当家作主; pinyin: Rénmín dāngjiā zuòzhǔ) is a political slogan used in the People's Republic of China (PRC). According to the Chinese Communist Party (CCP), it means "putting the interests of the people first and considering the people at all times". The CCP claims it is the essence and core of socialist democracy. Chinese Marxist scholars have argued that there is no completely identical political system model in the world.

== History ==
The 19th CCP National Congress in 2017 officially identified upholding the people's right to be masters of the country as one of the basic strategies for upholding and developing socialism with Chinese characteristics in the new era. The report of the Congress said that the "development of socialist democracy is to reflect the will of the people, safeguard the rights and interests of the people, stimulate the people’s creative vitality, and use the institutional system to ensure that the people are masters of the country".

On September 5, 2014, General Secretary Xi Jinping stated in his speech at the meeting celebrating the 60th anniversary of the founding of the National People's Congress: "The establishment of a new political system in which the people are the masters of the country in a country with a civilization history of more than 5,000 years and a population of hundreds of millions is of epoch-making significance in the history of China's political development and even in the history of world political development." He continued by saying "We should be inclusive of the colorful world, learn from others with an open mind, digest and absorb others' good things from an independent standpoint, and turn them into our own good things, but we must never swallow them whole or imitate others blindly."

== See also ==
- Common good
- General will
- Popular sovereignty
