= People =

Plurality of persons considered as a whole

The term "the people" refers to the public or common mass of people of a polity. As such it is a concept of human rights law, international law as well as constitutional law, particularly used for claims of popular sovereignty. In contrast, a people is any plurality of persons considered as a whole. Used in politics and law, the term "a people" refers to the collective or community of an ethnic group or nation.

== Concepts ==
=== Legal ===
Liberty Leading the People, 1830 by Eugène Delacroix

Chapter One, Article One of the Charter of the United Nations states that "peoples" have the right to self-determination. Though the mere status as peoples and the right to self-determination, as for example in the case of Indigenous peoples (peoples, as in all groups of indigenous people, not merely all indigenous persons as in indigenous people), does not automatically provide for independent sovereignty and therefore secession. Indeed, judge Ivor Jennings identified the inherent problems in the right of "peoples" to self-determination, as it requires pre-defining a said "people".

=== Constitutional ===
Both the Roman Republic and the Roman Empire used the Latin term Senatus Populusque Romanus, (the Senate and People of Rome). This term was fixed abbreviated (SPQR) to Roman legionary standards, and even after the Roman Emperors achieved a state of total personal autocracy, they continued to wield their power in the name of the Senate and People of Rome.

The term People's Republic, used since late modernity, is used by states that particularly identify constitutionally with a form of socialism.

=== Judicial ===
In criminal law, in certain jurisdictions, criminal prosecutions are brought in the name of the People. Several U.S. states, including California, Illinois, and New York, use this style. Citations outside the jurisdictions in question usually substitute the name of the state for the words "the People" in the case captions. Four states — Massachusetts, Virginia, Pennsylvania, and Kentucky — refer to themselves as the Commonwealth in case captions and legal process. Other states, such as Indiana, typically refer to themselves as the State in case captions and legal process. Outside the United States, criminal trials in Ireland and the Philippines are prosecuted in the name of the people of their respective states.

The political theory underlying this format is that criminal prosecutions are brought in the name of the sovereign; thus, in these U.S. states, the "people" are judged to be the sovereign, even as in the United Kingdom and other dependencies of the British Crown, criminal prosecutions are typically brought in the name of the Crown. "The people" identifies the entire body of the citizens of a jurisdiction invested with political power or gathered for political purposes.

=== Political ===
In China, definitions of the people (Chinese: 人民) by the Chinese Communist Party (CCP) have shifted throughout its history. At the 2nd National Congress held in 1922, it included the proletariat, peasants, and the bourgeoisie. Usage of the term dropped following the Shanghai Massacre in 1927, with the term largely being replaced by the term masses (Chinese: 民眾). The use of the term people increased again in 1935 following the establishment of the Second United Front with the Kuomintang. During the Second Sino-Japanese War, the people as defined by the Cihai dictionary, included "all the classes, strata, and social groups that participated in the resistance against the Japanese invasion". After the continuation of the Chinese Civil War, it was redefined to "the people were all the classes, strata, and social groups that opposed imperialism, the bureaucratic bourgeoisie, the landlord class, and the reactionary faction of the Kuomintang that represented these classes". The term was further redefined following the 1949 proclamation of the People's Republic of China. The Charter of the Chinese People’s Political Consultative Conference defines the people as "socialist laborers, builders of socialist undertakings, patriots who support socialism, and patriots who support the unity of the motherland and are committed to the great rejuvenation of the Chinese nation".

== See also ==
- Civitas
- Collective
- Community
- General will
- List of contemporary ethnic groups
- List of indigenous peoples
- Volk
- National identity
- Nationality
- Preamble to the United States Constitution
- Public
- Republic
- Republicanism
- Democracy
- People are the masters of their own country
- People's republic
- Populism
- Society
- Vox populi
