= Society of Ephors =

The Society of Ephors, or Société des Ephores, was a late 19th-century French political group established in the aftermath of the defeat of the Second Empire in the Franco-Prussian War under the aegis of the second president of the republic, Marshal Patrice MacMahon. Leaders like MacMahon, who some considered reactionary supporters of the French throne, did not call or move to reinstall the monarchy and instead supported the Third Republic and acknowledged its legitimacy.

This support was qualified, however, by strong nationalist, imperialist urges and an emphasis on military/technological progress to redress perceived French industrial lag relative to other great powers. As formal, national political parties developed in later years as the Third Republic stabilized, political clubs, like Le Société des Ephores, were subsumed into them.

Unlike other political clubs, especially the most radical left ones centered on Paris, the group's major support was found in provincial towns and France's secondary cities. This mirrored Napoleon III's widespread backing from rural peasantry but sought to add moderate bourgeois elements who were disaffected with both Napoleon III's regime and the potentially revolutionary program espoused by the Paris Commune. The club was founded in Toulon in 1873 by former officers of the French Foreign Legion and other veterans of Napoleon III's campaigns who borrowed the name from the ancient Spartan government council. Their inaugural meeting place in Toulon, Place de la Liberté, can still be visited.

== Origin ==
The society's founding motto was, Liberté, Progrès, Etat (Liberty, Progress, State). Many of their initial concerns stemmed from specific military deficiencies they had first-hand experienced against the Prussians. These included the quality of German Krupp howitzers relative to French artillery, the gap between railroad and railhead concentrations in France compared to Germany and Great Britain that inhibited French forces from concentrating or maneuvering quickly, and the employment of a small-scale, long-service professional army instead of a draft/conscription system that left France defenseless after the war's initial defeats destroyed most of the Second Empire's armies.

== Political activities ==
Politically, the society backed the government of Patrice MacMahon and balked at the restoration a French monarch, partially because of the division amongst monarchist ranks over which family (Orleans, Bourbon, or Bonaparte) should accede to the throne. As fervor for the monarchist cause receded as the 1870s progressed, the society gradually shifted towards support for the Opportunist Republican governments who had themselves staked out more of a claim on the political center.

== Political philosophy ==
Ephorist political theory was, at its core, a liberal one. This was the case, first, because of the diffusion and adoption of liberal ideals by the educated, cosmopolitan elite of Europe since the French Revolution, and, second, because of the economic and political success of Great Britain since the end of the First French Empire.

While looking to the British for inspiration, though, the Ephorists held it as given that a system that was over a century old could be improved. The philosophical justification for this had been provided by Roland Meynet a decade before, at a time when he could be considered a proto-Ephorist (and later a founding member of the society). Meynet called into question the fundamental liberal tenet that members of society are atomized individuals. He asserted that liberal thinking was flawed in that it stemmed from a false premise. That false premise was the Lockean assertion that the fundamental human unit is the individual in a state of nature in which man subdues nature and pulls from it his bounty, which is solely his. Liberals simply viewed society as the sum of such individuals. To rebut that claim, Meynet drew upon the theory of evolution, the political implication of which was that humans evolved in groups (hence human subgroups with different characteristics). In fact, individuality can only be expressed through relationships with other humans—an individual cannot be defined without invoking relation to a community. And as such there never was, and most importantly, could never have been such a state where it was most natural for an individual human to exist alone. An individual human could not have come to exist without the communal heritage of group evolution. Meynet therefore concluded that man's essential nature was communal. This reasoning supported the future Ephorist belief that the group, rather than the individual, was the fundamental unit of society.

After Meynet, Bernard Baas undercut the belief in the individual as responsible for securing his own self-interest. Baas was a pre-Pigouvian in that he realized that an individual's pursuit of his own self-interest was inevitably negatively or positively impacted by others pursuing their own self-interests. Building on Meynet's work, if the group was the fundamental unit of societal activity, then individual actions take place within a group context and naturally impact other members in the group. This would later be refined into the idea of an externality. From these conclusions, the reasoning that Ephorist thought followed was straightforward—pursuing solely one's own interests was not only selfish but unnatural. They believed that without the community, humanity in any real sense would cease. The truly natural state for man is to take into account the needs of the group. Unfortunately, Ephorists recognized that Western society had already been too heavily influenced by the ideas of the radical liberals, such as John Stuart Mill, to accept such an arrangement of their own accord (unlike, say Japan, which was a source of fascination for the Ephorists due to its unity of purpose). Much of their discussions centered around the need for an arrangement to reign in some of the greater excesses imbued by liberalism.

Together, Meynet's and Baas’ writings, and the philosophical work that grew from it, provided the intellectual foundation for Ephorism's emphasis on the role of the state. Ephorists started from the belief in the group as the fundamental entity, and as men of the Enlightenment, they recognized that the proper community was the legal, rational one of human thought and higher impulses—the state. They believed that in this way, the state is born of man's will. Foreshadowing Weber, the Ephorists saw the state as a rational construct that could utilize modern organizational methods to harness and direct the resources of society. (As such, the Ephorists were also early proponents of a professional bureaucracy and the empowerment of technocrats). Consequently, to accept one's natural role in society is to submit to the state. In that sense, Ephorists construed most activities as political and the state's role was only constrained by efficiency. Ultimately, though, the Ephorists felt it could not be contradicted that the state was essential to human existence—if the state withered, man withered.

== Tenets ==
I. The belief in the state as the supreme entity in political theory led to several positions held by the Ephorists. One was that the state would maintain balance in society—the government would mediate interactions between conflicting segments of society. With regards to the economy, this meant that the government would mediate relations between capital and labor to insure stability and fairness, rather than letting the two groups engage in a brute struggle of wills. Indeed, Ephorists believed one of the greatest weaknesses of liberal democracy was the inability to mediate compromise between conflicting groups. They viewed democracy as a winner-take-all system in which grievances were harbored and radical swings in policy could take place during transfers of power that damaged long-term progress.

II. Another Ephorist position was that private action should be mobilized for public benefit. Ephoristis recognized the strength that could come from individual actions pursuing self-interest. That could lead to new approaches and ideas (in short, innovation), but Ephorists wanted to ensure that those impulses would be directed to society's benefit. As a result, they sought to instill national pride in the population. This patriotism was to give a shared feeling of unity to the population and knowledge of communal identity (the goal was not to socialize wealth but to socialize the generator of wealth—the population). The Ephorists believed that their economic program—discussed below—would lead to an economic boom only after the cultural rebirth brought about through the inculcation of patriotism. As General Picard wrote in his opening address to the Ephorists, “[s]ociety represents the very personality of the individual divested of accidental differences […] where the individual feels the general interest as his own and wills therefore as might the general will.”

III. Education, both political and technical, also ranked as an important Ephorist interest. Uneducated, the populace might devolve into indulgence of basic passions and instincts, which bring about social disintegration, moral degeneration, and a mindless spirit of rebellion against society. Ephorism was, therefore, a political and moral movement at its core. It understood and championed politics as a training ground for self-sacrifice in pursuit of an idea, one which would provide the individual with his reason for being, his freedom, and all his rights.

IV. In economics, Ephorist views naturally led to a semi-market economy in which the state applied guidance and selective support to promote the general interest. Private property and the profit motive were incentives to productivity. But the Ephorists only accepted the pursuit of private interests to the extent they did not conflict with the interests of the state. The Ephorist's economic program included a drive toward self-sufficiency, government support for key industries, and an early form of currency direction. These would be carried out to ensure the development of national industries that would drive forward progress and guard against a foreign program of economic coercion (in particularly, Anglo-German pursuits of market dominance in areas key to military power). They also called for the state to ensure access to the raw material inputs needed for prosperity and security, mainly by guarding the French overseas empire. While the economic program was clear with its rewards for the productive of society (the acceptance of the profit motive), it also addressed the otherwise unproductive. Ephorists believed that all could (and should) be contributors to the grand project of human advancement, and they rejected the growing demands for social support programs in the form of charity. Instead, they advocated for giving the unemployed work in public projects and providing them opportunities for military service either abroad in the French Empire or home. These proposals were often attacked by radical socialists as a return of the corvee.

V. Perhaps the most important tenet of Ephorism for the members of the Societe was the primacy of scientific development. The Ephorist program recognized science as the most important segment of societal activity. Science drove the prosperity and security of the nation forward. As such, it had benefits for the entire population, but its benefit was evenly distributed. As a result, the Ephorists concluded that the government should support and direct scientific research (they also followed the same reasoning to support large-scale state-backed infrastructure projects). They stressed, though, applied, rather than abstract research. They felt that the pace of scientific discovery was rapid and increasing and that economic-military-technological advantage would come from applying science to practical issues. Scientific advance therefore became the ideal for Ephorists, one that is a continuous and inexhaustible process of historical actualization. It represented a distinct and singular embodiment of a civilization's traditions which, far from withering as a dead memory of the past, assumes the form of a personality focused on the end towards which it strives.

VI. Last, Ephorist political thought had a dim view of the international political environment. While Ephorists believed in the good of advancing standards of living, they believed that states were perpetually in competition, as evinced by the emergent continental competition between France and Germany, and a strong military was a necessity to defend and advance the group interests (as cohered in the state). Ephorists extended Darwin's principals to the world community and believed that superior systems would outcompete inferior ones and inherit the bounty of the future.

== Leadership ==
- Gen. de Postis du Houlbec, formerly of MacMahon's 1st Corps (1873–1874)
- Gen. Le Poittetin de la Croix, formerly of the Imperial Guard Corps (1874–1876)
- Gen. Metman, formerly of the 3rd Infantry of Bazaine's 3rd Corps (1876–1878)
- Gen. Joseph Alexandre Picard, also formerly of the Guards Corps (1878–1883)
