= Popular sovereignty =

Idea that the people are the source of all power

Popular sovereignty is the principle that the leaders of a state and its government are created and sustained by the consent of its people, who are the source of all political legitimacy. Popular sovereignty, being a principle, does not imply any particular political implementation. (Note: Leonard Levy notes of the "doctrine" of popular sovereignty that it "relates primarily not to the Constitution's [actual] operation but to its source of authority and supremacy, ratification, amendment, and possible abolition" (Tarcov 1986, v. 3, p. 1426).) Benjamin Franklin expressed the concept when he wrote that "In free governments, the rulers are the servants and the people their superiors and sovereigns".

== Origins ==
Defensor pacis by Marsilius of Padua provoked a storm of controversy when it appeared in 1324 by advocating a form of republicanism that views the people as the only legitimate source of political authority. Sovereignty lies with the people, and the people should elect, correct, and, if necessary, depose its political leaders.

Further development of the theory of popular sovereignty is found among the School of Salamanca (see e.g. Francisco de Vitoria (1483–1546) or Francisco Suarez (1548–1617)). Like the theorists of the divine right of kings and Locke, the Salamancans saw sovereignty as emanating originally from God. However, unlike the divine right theorists and in agreement with Locke, they saw it as passing from God to all people equally, not only to monarchs.

Popular sovereignty in its modern sense is an idea that dates to the social contract school represented by Thomas Hobbes (1588–1679), John Locke (1632–1704), and Jean-Jacques Rousseau (1712–1778). Rousseau authored a book titled The Social Contract, a prominent political work that highlighted the idea of the "general will". The central tenet of popular sovereignty is that the legitimacy of a government's authority and of its laws is based on the consent of the governed. Hobbes, Locke, and Rousseau all held that individuals enter into a social contract, voluntarily giving up some of their natural freedom, so as to secure protection from the dangers inherent in the freedom of others. Whether men are seen as naturally more prone to violence and rapine (Hobbes) or to cooperation and kindness (Rousseau), the idea that a legitimate social order emerges only when liberties and duties are equal among citizens binds the social contract thinkers to the concept of popular sovereignty.

Republics and popular monarchies are theoretically based on popular sovereignty. However, a legalistic notion of popular sovereignty does not necessarily imply an effective, functioning democracy. A party or even an individual dictator may claim to represent the will of the people and rule in its name, which would be congruent with Hobbes's view on the subject. Most modern definitions present democracy as a necessary condition of popular sovereignty.

Judge Ivor Jennings called the notion that governments are the creation of the consent of its people "ridiculous", as "the people cannot decide until somebody decides who are the people".

== United States ==
The application of the doctrine of popular sovereignty receives particular emphasis in American history, notes historian Christian G. Fritz's American Sovereigns: The People and America's Constitutional Tradition Before the Civil War, a study of the early history of American constitutionalism. In describing how Americans attempted to apply this doctrine prior to the territorial struggle over slavery that led to the Civil War, political scientist Donald S. Lutz noted the variety of American applications:

To speak of popular sovereignty is to place ultimate authority in the people. There are a variety of ways in which sovereignty may be expressed. It may be immediate in the sense that the people make the law themselves, or mediated through representatives who are subject to election and recall; it may be ultimate in the sense that the people have a negative or veto over legislation, or it may be something much less dramatic. In short, popular sovereignty covers a multitude of institutional possibilities. In each case, however, popular sovereignty assumes the existence of some form of popular consent, and it is for this reason that every definition of republican government implies a theory of consent.

— Donald S. Lutz (Note: Additional support for the centrality of popular sovereignty include: Ronald M. Peters, Jr., suggests the following as embodying the meaning of popular sovereignty for Americans – "The concept of popular sovereignty holds simply that in a society organized for political action, the will of the people as a whole is the only right standard of political action" (Peters, Jr. 1978, p. 1); Donald S. Lutz suggests that popular sovereignty came to have meaning in "the way Americans viewed themselves as a people. They firmly believed that on their own authority they could form themselves into a community, create or replace a government to order their community, select and replace those who hold government office, determine which values bind them as a community and thus which values should guide them those in government when making decisions for the community, and replace political institutions at variance with these values" (Lutz 1980, p. 10); Joel H. Silbey, states "The justification of the American Revolution and republican government—-as opposed to the monarchical forms of government in Europe—rested on the theory of popular sovereignty. In essence, that theory established the basic premise of American political life: the ultimate and sole legitimacy of government rests on the consent of 'the people.' Defining 'the people' became one of the central issues in the development of the American experience, but soon after declaring independence, American revolutionaries came to agree that popular sovereignty underlay America's republican governments. If identifying 'the people' and their role in changing government took many decades, the problem of how to locate popular sovereignty was solved relatively quickly by the institutional device of the constitutional convention" (Silbey 1994, v. I, p. 37).)

The American Revolution marked a departure in the concept of popular sovereignty as it had been discussed and employed in the European historical context. American revolutionaries aimed to substitute the sovereignty in the person of King George III, with a collective sovereign—composed of the people. Thenceforth, American revolutionaries generally agreed with and were committed to the principle that governments were legitimate only if they rested on popular sovereignty – that is, the sovereignty of the people. (Note: Paul K. Conkin describes "the almost unanimous acceptance of popular sovereignty at the level of abstract principle" (Conkin 1974, p. 52); Edmund S. Morgan, concludes that the American Revolution "confirmed and completed the subordination of government to the will of the people" (Morgan 1977, p. 101); Willi Paul Adams asserts that statements of the "principle" of the people's sovereignty "expressed the very heart of the consensus among the victors of 1776" (Adams 1980, p. 137).) This was often linked with the notion of the consent of the governed—the idea of the people as a sovereign—and had clear 17th- and 18th-century intellectual roots in English history.

=== 1850s ===
In the 1850s, in the run-up to the Civil War, Northern Democrats led by Senator Lewis Cass of Michigan and Stephen A. Douglas of Illinois promoted "popular sovereignty" as a middle position on the slavery issue. It said that white residents of territories should be able to decide by voting whether or not slavery would be allowed in the territory. The federal government did not have to make the decision, and by appealing to democracy, Cass and Douglas hoped they could finesse the question of support for or opposition to slavery. Douglas applied "popular sovereignty" to Kansas in the Kansas-Nebraska Act, which passed Congress in 1854. The Act stated that in Kansas and Nebraska, "every free white male inhabitant above the age of twenty-one years...shall be entitled to vote at the first election".

The Act had two unexpected results. By dropping the Missouri Compromise of 1820 under which said slavery would never be allowed in Kansas, it was a major boost for the expansion of slavery. Overnight, outrage united anti-slavery forces across the North into an "anti-Nebraska" movement that soon was institutionalized as the Republican Party, with its firm commitment to stop the expansion of slavery.

Also, pro- and anti-slavery elements moved into Kansas with the intention of allowing or banning slavery, which led to a raging state-level civil war, known as "Bleeding Kansas". Abraham Lincoln targeted popular sovereignty in the Lincoln–Douglas debates of 1858, which left Douglas in a position that alienated Southern pro-slavery Democrats, who considered him weak in his support of slavery. The Southern Democrats broke with the party and ran their own candidate against Lincoln and Douglas in 1860.

== See also ==
- Claim of Right 1989
- Consent of the governed
- Self-determination
- Self-governance
- Declaration of Arbroath
- Legitimacy (political)
- Man-made law
- Parliamentary sovereignty
- People are the masters of their own country
- Philosophical anarchism
- Retroversion of the sovereignty to the people
- Sovereign citizen movement
