= Jacob Vernes =

Genevan theologian and Protestant pastor

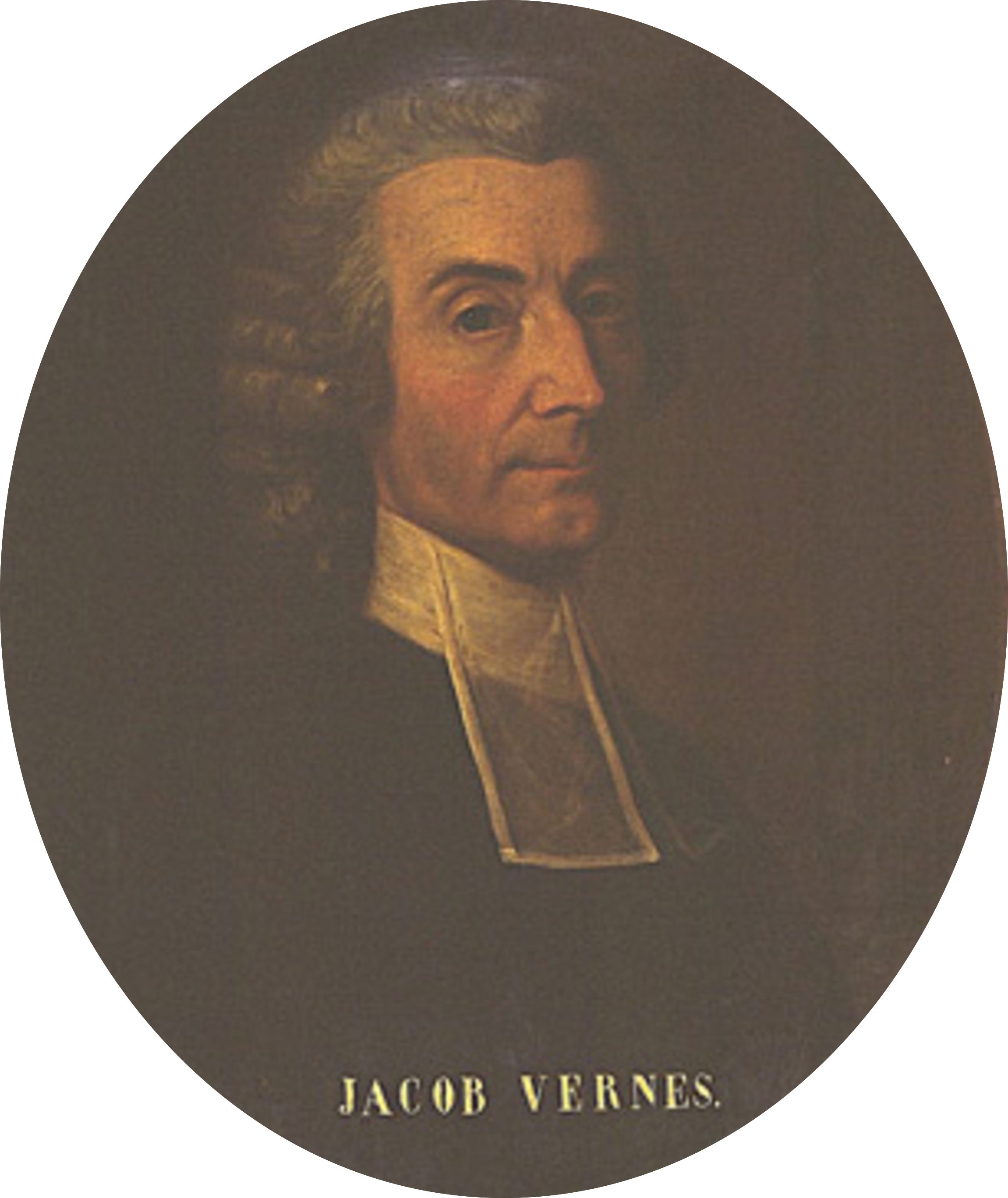
Portrait of Jacob Vernes

Jacob Vernes (Note: Not to be confused with Jacob Vernet, a prominent theologian in Geneva around the same time.) (31 May 1728 – 22 October 1791) was a Genevan theologian and Protestant pastor in Geneva, famous for his correspondence with Voltaire and Rousseau.

== Life ==
Vernes was born on 31 May 1728 in Geneva, and was educated as a pastor. He was a wealthy man, well-mannered and cultivated, and had many friends. At the age of 22 he made a tour of Europe, where he met many of the leading intellectuals of the day. Vernes was pastor of Céligny (1761–1768) and of Grand-Saconnex (1768–1770). He became a pastor at Geneva in 1771. Vernes married Marie-Francoise Clarence from Puylaurens, but she died less than a year later. On 18 March 1764 he married Marianne Simonde, aunt of the historian Jean Charles Léonard de Sismondi, who was to be the mother of Francois Vernes de Luze. In November 1782 Vernes was deposed from his position as pastor after disturbances in the city led to the intervention of the French and the cantons of Zurich and Bern on the side of the aristocratic party. Vernes died on 22 October 1791, in Geneva.

== Work ==
Vernes collaborated with his friend Antoine-Jacques Roustan in writing a History of Geneva, which remained in manuscript form. He wrote and published many other books on religious subjects. Vernes shared with some of his contemporaries the view that religion should not be considered only through cold reason but also through emotion. God had given men "sensitive hearts" and the ability to feel an "inner religious sentiment". He was ambiguous on some subjects, for example writing that the Bible contained evidence both for and against the doctrine of eternal punishment. Vernes was said to have held Socinianist or Arian views, with unorthodox opinions on the nature of Christ, and these were said to be reflected in his writings. His Catéchisme a l'usage des jeunes-gens published in 1779 was not officially adopted by the Genevan Church. It differs from other post-orthodox Calvinist in its simplified theology, while still recognizing the need to rely on Scripture to understand fully essential religious truths.

== Voltaire and Rousseau ==
Vernes became a close friend of Voltaire, who called him his "dear priest" and he often visited Voltaire at Ferney. To Voltaire, Vernes's Calvinism seemed no more than nominal. In December 1761 Voltaire sent him a copy of his "Sermon du rabbin Akib", a scathing attack on Christian persecution of the Jews. However, in his book Confidence Philosophique (1779), written as a novel, Vernes attacked Voltaire and the principles of Encyclopédistes.

At first, Vernes was a friend of Rousseau, with whom he corresponded. When he talked with Rousseau during his visit to Geneva in 1754 he was impressed by the sincerity with which the philosopher discussed divine providence. In 1757, Jean le Rond d'Alembert published an article on Geneva in the seventh volume of the Encyclopedia that suggested that the Geneva clergymen had moved from Calvinism to pure Socinianism, basing this on information provided by Voltaire. The Pastors of Geneva were indignant, and appointed a committee to answer these charges. Vernes asked Rousseau as a friend to obtain some sort of retraction from d'Alembert, but Rousseau had to say that he was not on close terms with d'Alembert, so was unable to do so. However, under pressure, d'Alembert eventually made the excuse that he considered anyone who did not accept the Church of Rome to be a Socinianist, and that was all he meant.

Later, Vernes attacked Rousseau for the views he expressed in the Confession of Faith of a Savoyard Vicar in the last section of Emile: or, On Education (1762). Voltaire was also extremely hostile to Rousseau, and the two engaged in a war of pamphlets, some anonymous and purportedly written by their antagonist. When Voltaire published one such attack called "Sentiment of the Citizens", Rousseau at first thought it had been written by Vernes, who had expressed similar views. Rousseau had the pamphlet republished in Paris naming Vernes as the author, and only later accepted that this was not the case.

== Bibliography ==
- Jacob Vernes (1755). Choix littéraire. Claude Philibert.
- Jacob Vernes; I. L. (1763). Lettres sur le Christianisme de Mr. J.J. Rousseau, addressées à Mr. I.L. E. Blanc.
- Jacob Vernes; François-Louis-Claude Marin (1765). Recueil d'opuscules concernant les ouvrages et les sentiments de nos philosophes modernes sur la religion: l'éducation et les moeurs. Staatman.
- Jacob Vernes (Pasteur) (1765). Examen de ce qui concerne le christianisme, la réformation évangélique, et les ministres de Genève, dans les deux premières Lettres de Mr. J.J. Rousseau, écrites de la montagne. Chez Claude Philibert.
- Jacob Vernes (Pasteur) (1775). Convient-il de supprimer une partie des sermons qui se prononcent à Genève ?: examen de cette question. B. Chirol.
- Jacob Vernes (1776). Catechisme: Destine Particulierement A LG_TUsage Des Jeunes Gens.
- Jacob Vernes (1779). Catéchisme a l'usage des jeunes gens. J.L. Pellet, Imprimeur de la Republique.
- Jacob Vernes (1779). Confidence Philosophique, Volume 2. Du Villard & Nouffer.
- Jacob Vernes (786). Trois sermons: Prononcés dans l'Église Protestante de Constance le 16, le 23 & le 30 d'Avril 1786.
- Jacob Vernes (1790). Sermons Prononces a Geneve.
- Jacob Vernes, François Vernes (1792). Sermons. Didier.
