= Chais =

Chais is a surname. Notable people with the surname include:

- Charles-Pierre Chais, Geneva-based pastor
- Irving D. Chais, American businessman
- Stanley Chais (1926–2010), American investment advisor, money manager, and philanthropist

== See also ==
- Chai (disambiguation)
