= Alfonso Muzzarelli =

Italian theologian

Reverend Alfonso Muzzarelli
- Born: August 22, 1749; Ferrara, Papal States
- Died: 25 May 1813 (aged 63); Paris, First French Empire
- Occupations: Jesuit priest; Scholar; Philosopher
- Title: abbot
- Parent(s): Francesco Muzzarelli and Isabella Muzzarelli (née Moro)

Academic background
- Education: Cicognini National Boarding School
- Influences: Francesco Antonio Zaccaria

Alfonso Muzzarelli (22 August 1749, Ferrara – 25 May 1813, Paris) was an Italian Jesuit theologian and scholar.

== Life ==
He entered the Jesuit novitiate on 20 October 1768, and taught grammar at Bologna and Imola. After the suppression of the order in 1773, he received a benefice at Ferrara and, somewhat later, was made director of the Collegio dei Nobili at Parma.

Pope Pius VII summoned him to Rome, and appointed him theologian of the Apostolic Penitentiary. When Pius VII was brought to Paris by Napoleon, in 1809, Muzzarelli was also transported to Paris, where he spent his remaining life at the convent of the Dames de Saint-Michel.

== Works ==
He wrote numerous theological, philosophical and ascetical works. His chief production is a collection of philosophico-theological treatises published repeatedly under the title Il buon uso della Logica in materia di Religione (6 vols., Foligno, 1787–9), with additions by the author (10 vols., Rome, 1807; 11 vols. Florence, 1821–3).

The collection contains sketches on the theological questions on the day such as - abuses in the Catholic Church, the temporal power of the pope, religious toleration, ecclesiastical immunity, riches of the Catholic church and its clergy, primacy and infallibility of the pope, auricular confession, religious institutes, indulgences, Gregory VII, moral liberty, etc.

This collection of treatises, with the exception of the last five, was translated into Latin by Zeldmayer de Buzitha (Bonus usus logiae in materia religionis, Kaschau, 1818–7). A French translation, containing 42 treatises, was published at Brussels in 1837.

Two other major productions of Muzzarelli are L'Emilio disingannato (4 vols., Siena, 1782–3) and Confutasione del contratto sociale di Gian Jacopo Rousseau (2 vols., Foligno, 1794) - the former is a refutation of Rousseau's Emile, the Iatter of his Contrat social.

The most popular of Muzzarelli's many ascetical works is Il mese di Maria o sia di Maggio (Ferrara, 1785) of which about 100 editions have been issued (new ed., Bologna, 1901). It was translated into English (The Month of Mary or the Month of May", London, 1848, 187), Spanish (Las Vegas, New Mexico, 1887, 1888); Portuguese (Oporto, 1890); French (Paris, 1881, and often previously); Arabic (4 ed., Beyrouth, 1872); and adapted to the German (Mainz, 1883).

Another little work that has been translated into English is: Il buon uso delle vacanze (Parma, 1798). Its English title is: A Method of spending the Vacation profitably. Addressed to the Youth who frequent the Schools of the Society of Jesus (London and Dublin, 1848).

== Sources ==
- Sommervogel, Bibliothèque de la Compagnie de Jésus, V (Brussels and Paris, 1894),1488–1514; IX (1900), 708–710;
- Hugo von Hurter (1911). Nomenclator Literarius. Vol. V, I. pp. 621–624.
