= Religious republic =

Religious republic could refer to:

- Christian republic
- Islamic republic
