= John Wilford =

English bookseller

John Wilford (fl. 1723–1742) was an English bookseller.

== Life ==
He was actively engaged in his profession in 1723 when he began issuing a monthly circular of new books. Shortly after 1730, when fortunes were being made in the trade by books issued in weekly parts, Wilford, whose place of business was in the Old Bailey, entered the ranks of publishers, but obtained no more than a precarious footing. In 1741 Wilford was living at the Three Luces in Little Britain, the stronghold of the bookselling trade. After 1742 he drops out of notice.

== Works ==
From March 1723 to December 1729 Wilford issued in monthly parts, at threepence each, a price-list called A Monthly Catalogue or General Register of Books, Sermons, Plays, and Pamphlets, printed or reprinted either at London or the two Universities. Appended to most of the numbers are proposals for printing various works by subscription. During 1731–2 he employed Thomas Stackhouse on the Works of archbishop Sir William Dawes, with a preface and life of the author. In order to swell the third volume to the required size, Stackhouse complained that Wilford had insisted upon his padding out Dawes's Duties of the Closet with miscellaneous prayers by various authors. In 1732 in his Bookbinder, Bookprinter, and Bookseller refuted, Stackhouse gives a comic account of Wilford and a fellow-publisher Thomas Edlin disputing, at the Castle Tavern in Paternoster Row, as to whether there was money to be made out of a Roman history in weekly parts. Edlin strongly advocated the attempt, but Wilford's talked about the remunerative properties of devotional tracts and family directors.

During the summer of 1734 Wilford was arrested by a government messenger in consequence of his name being on the title-page of an opposition squib, Jonathan Swift's anonymous Epistle to a Lady, containing an attack on Sir R. "Brass" (i.e. Robert Walpole). Wilford referred the matter back to Lawton Gilliver; it was eventually dropped, but Swift's responsibility came out.

Early in 1735 Wilford published Dr. John Armstrong's Essay for Abridging the Study of Physick. During the same period he was publisher of the Daily Post-Boy, and a sharer in Edmund Curll's venture with Alexander Pope's quasi-unauthorised Letters. The advertisement to this work in May, giving the names of Pope's titled correspondents, was held to be a breach of privilege, and Wilford was summoned with Curll to attend in the House of Lords, where he was examined but disclaimed responsibility, and after a second attendance on 13 May 1735 he was discharged.

During 1741 Wilford issued in weekly parts to subscribers Memorials and Characters, together with the Lives of Divers Eminent and Worthy Persons (1600–1740), collected and compiled from above 150 different authors, several scarce pieces and some original MSS. communicated to the editor … to which is added an appendix of monumental inscriptions (London, 1741). The Lives (some 240 in number, one-third of them being those of women) were mostly drawn from funeral sermons; some were from Anthony Wood's Athenæ, Ralph Thoresby's Leeds, John Prince's Worthies of Devon. One or two are abridged from Lives by Isaak Walton or other biographers. Wilford took the credit of editorship, and the book was known as Wilford's Lives, but it was the work of compilers in his pay, mainly John Jones (1700–1770).
