= John Simpson (Unitarian) =

English Unitarian minister and religious writer

To be distinguished from John Simpson (Presbyterian) (1740–1808), active in the American War of Independence.

John Simpson (1746–1812) was an English Unitarian minister and religious writer, known as a biblical critic. Some of his essays were very well known in the nineteenth century. Simpson was also known for his rejection of the literal existence of the devil, following on from writers like Arthur Ashley Sykes.

== Life ==
The youngest son of Nathaniel and Elizabeth Simpson, he was born at Leicester on 19 March 1746. After being at a dissenting academy at Kibworth, Leicestershire, under John Aikin, and at Market Harborough, he entered Warrington Academy in 1760. In 1765 he migrated to Glasgow University, where he was a pupil of William Leechman. Leaving Glasgow in 1767, he spent some years in home study. In April 1772 he succeeded Thomas Bruckshaw as junior minister of High Pavement Chapel, Nottingham. He became sole minister on the death of John Milne in the following September; in 1774 George Walker became his colleague. Simpson and Walker got back a section of the congregation which had seceded in 1760. In August 1777 Simpson moved to Walthamstow, Essex, to assist Hugh Farmer as afternoon preacher. He resigned this office in 1779, retired from active duty, married, and moved to Yorkshire, living at Cottingham, East Riding; Little Woodham, near Leeds; and Leeds itself.

In 1791 Simpson settled at Bath for the remainder of his days; there he was pastor of the Unitarian Chapel, Princes Street. He died on 18 August 1812, and was buried on 31 August at Lyncomb, near Bath. In his obituary he was praised as "one of the most amiable of men".

Simpson lived much among his books, and made few friends; among them was Joseph Stock. When Archibald Maclaine retired to Bath, he and Simpson were on good terms.

== Works ==
- An essay to show that Christianity is best conveyed in the historic form. London 1782
- Christian arguments for social and public worship. 1792
- A reply to the Reverend Mr. Williams's answer to an essay, shewing that "Civil mandates for days of public worship are no argument against joining in it." 1794
- An essay on religious fasting and humiliation. London, 1795
- Thoughts on the novelty, the excellence, and the evidence, of the Christian religion. London, 1798
- Internal and presumptive evidences of Christianity, considered separately and as uniting to form one argument. London, 1801
- Internal and presumptive evidences of Christianity. 1801
- Plain thoughts on the New Testament doctrine of atonement. Cambridge, 1802
- Arguments for the use of a printed congregational liturgy, for public worship. 1803
- An essay on the duration of a future state of punishments and rewards. 1803
- An essay on the impropriety of the usual mode of teaching Christian theology. 1803
- An attempt to explain the meaning of the words satan, satanas, diabolos, and of other supposed synonymous expressions in the Old and New Testament. Bath 1804
- Essays on the language of scripture. Bath 1806
- An explanation of John 1:1 to 18. 1807
- Additional essays on the language of Scripture. London 1812

Posthumous were:

- Two Essays … on the Effects of Christianity … on the Sabbath, 1815.
- Sermons, 1816, (edited by his son).

Simpson published sermons and essays. Those on topics of biblical criticism were collected as his major work Essays on the Language of Scripture, Bath, 1806, enlarged, Bath, 1812, 2 vols. They include An Essay on the Duration of a Future State of Punishments and Rewards, 1803; an argument for universal restoration, commended by Joseph Priestley. Essays on the Language of Scripture was cited frequently in the second, Unitarian, edition of the Archbishop of Armagh William Newcome's translation of the New Testament, where Simpson was given the abbreviation "Sn." indicating the work's wide use among Dissenters, Independents and Unitarians. The Essays were also cited in 19th-century general reference books.

== Family ==
Simpson married, in 1780, Frances, daughter of Thomas Woodhouse of Gainsborough, and widow of Watson of Cottingham, and left one son, John Woodhouse Simpson of Rearsby, Leicestershire.
