= Idées républicaines =

1765 political pamphlet by Voltaire

Idées républicaines (Republican ideas) is a political pamphlet by the French philosopher and author Voltaire. It was published anonymously and undated, but is thought to have been written in late 1765. It defends free thought and free expression in general, and also contains Voltaire's thoughts on the ongoing campaign for democracy in Geneva, where he supported greater power for the citizens.

== Content ==
The pamphlet includes critical commentary on Jean-Jacques Rousseau's The Social Contract and Montesquieu's The Spirit of the Laws.

It also defends the natural right to free expression. The Social Contract had been burned at Geneva. Voltaire writes, "The operation of burning it was perhaps as odious as that of writing it. [...] If the book was dangerous, it should have been refuted. To burn a book of argument is to say: 'We do not have enough wit to reply to it.'" He comments that England, despite being a monarchy, has a more enlightened population than other countries because the right to publish is protected by law.

Voltaire writes that a perfect government is impossible, but that a republic is the closest to achieving natural equality.

There are many textual similarities between Idées républicaines and Voltaire's private memorandum on the struggle in Geneva, Propositions à examiner pour apaiser les divisions de Genève.
