= Christian republic =

Government that is both Christian and republican

A Christian republic is a government that is both Christian and republican.

== Concept ==
In A Letter Concerning Toleration, Locke wrote that "there is absolutely no such thing, under the Gospel, as a Christian Commonwealth". By this he meant that political authority cannot be validly founded upon Christianity. Rousseau, in On the Social Contract (in book 4, chapter 8), echoed this, saying that "I am mistaken in saying 'a Christian republic'; the two words are mutually exclusive.". However, Rousseau's point was subtly different, in that he was asserting that a civic identity cannot be moulded out of Christianity. David Walsh, founder of the National Institute on Media and the Family, acknowledges that there is a "genuine tension ... between Christianity and the political order" that Rousseau was acknowledging, arguing that "many Christians would, after all, agree with him that a 'Christian republic' is a contradiction in terms" and that the two live "in an uneasy relationship in actual states, and social cohesion has often been bought at the price of Christian universalism". Robert Neelly Bellah has observed that most of the great republican theorists of the Western world have shared Rousseau's concerns about the mutually exclusive nature of republicanism and Christianity, from Machiavelli (more on which later) to Alexis de Tocqueville.

Rousseau's thesis is that the two are incompatible because they make different demands upon the virtuous man. Christianity, according to Rousseau, demands submission (variously termed "servitude" or "slavery" by scholars of his work) to imposed authority and resignation, and requires focus upon the unworldly; whereas republicanism demands participation rather than submission, and requires focus upon the worldly. Rousseau's position on Christianity is not universally held. Indeed, it was refuted by, amongst others, his friend Antoine-Jacques Roustan in a reply to the Social Contract.

Rousseau's thesis has a basis in the prior writings of Niccolò Machiavelli, whom Rousseau called a "good citizen and an honest man" and who alongside Montesquieu was one of Rousseau's sources for republican philosophy. In his Discoursi Machiavelli observes that Christianity in practice has not met the ideals of its foundation, and that the resultant corruption leads, when mixed with secular political ideals, to something that is neither good religion nor good politics. Further, he argues, whilst Christianity does not preclude love for one's country, it does require citizens to endure damage to republican government, stating that the best civic virtue in regards to a republic is to show no mercy to the republic's enemies and to put to death or to enslave the inhabitants of an opposing city that has been defeated.

== Calvinist republics ==
=== Calvin's Geneva ===
Cities in the Habsburg Netherlands where Calvinists seized control in 1577–8. Run by Committees of XVIII, the most prominent of these – Ghent, Antwerp and Brussels – are known as 'Calvinist republics' (1577–1585).

While the classical writers had been the primary ideological source for the republics of Italy, in Northern Europe, the Protestant Reformation would be used as justification for establishing new republics. Most important was Calvinist theology, which developed in Geneva (a city-state associated with the Old Swiss Confederacy – a powerful republic – since 1526 due to its anti-Savoy alliance treaty with Bern and Fribourg). John Calvin did not call for the abolition of monarchy, but he advanced the doctrine that the faithful had the right to overthrow irreligious monarchs. During 1536–8 and 1541–64, Calvin and his allies turned Geneva into the first so-called Calvinist republic. Calvinism also espoused egalitarianism and an opposition to hierarchy. Advocacy for republics appeared in the writings of the Huguenots during the French Wars of Religion.

=== Netherlands ===
Calvinism played an important role in the republican revolts in England and the Netherlands. Like the city-states of Italy and the Hanseatic League, both were important trading centres, with a large merchant class prospering from the trade with the New World. Large parts of the population of both areas also embraced Calvinism. During the Dutch Revolt (beginning in 1566), the Dutch Republic emerged from rejection of Spanish Habsburg rule. However, the country did not adopt the republican form of government immediately: in the formal declaration of independence (Act of Abjuration, 1581), the throne of king Philip, was only declared vacant, and the Dutch magistrates asked the Duke of Anjou, queen Elizabeth of England and prince William of Orange, one after another, to replace Philip. It took until 1588 before the Estates (the Staten, the representative assembly at the time) decided to vest the sovereignty of the country in itself. The Calvinist Dutch Reformed Church never became the official state church of the Dutch Republic, but it was publicly privileged over all other religions and churches, which did enjoy some level of tolerance, however.

Earlier during the Dutch Revolt, many autonomous cities in the Southern Netherlands also came under the control of radical Calvinists, especially in the years 1577–1578, and formed so-called Calvinist republics. Due to its extreme theocratic tendencies, the most notable was the Calvinist Republic of Ghent (1577–1584), but Antwerp and Brussels have also been characterised by historians as Calvinist republics between 1577 and 1585. One by one, these cities were reconquered by the Spanish Army of Flanders commanded by Alexander Farnese, Duke of Parma. In the north, Amsterdam experienced the Alteratie, a bloodless coup in which Calvinists took control of the city, but mostly in order to end its economic isolation and resume trade; no Calvinist regime was established here.

=== English Commonwealth ===
In 1641 the English Civil War began. Spearheaded by the Puritans and funded by the merchants of London, the revolt was a success, and led to the Commonwealth of England and the execution of King Charles I. In England James Harrington, Algernon Sidney, and John Milton became some of the first writers to argue for rejecting monarchy and embracing a republican form of government. The English Commonwealth was short lived, and the monarchy soon restored. The Dutch Republic continued in name until 1795, but by the mid-18th century the stadtholder had become a de facto monarch. Calvinists were also some of the earliest settlers of the British and Dutch colonies of North America.

== See also ==
- Christian state
- Christian democracy
- Christian egalitarianism
- Christianity
- Christian libertarianism
- Christianity and politics
- Civil religion
- Islamic republic
- Islamic state
- Jewish state
- Secular republic
- State religion
