= Thomas Stackhouse =

English theologian and controversialist

Thomas Stackhouse (1677–1752) was an English theologian and controversialist.

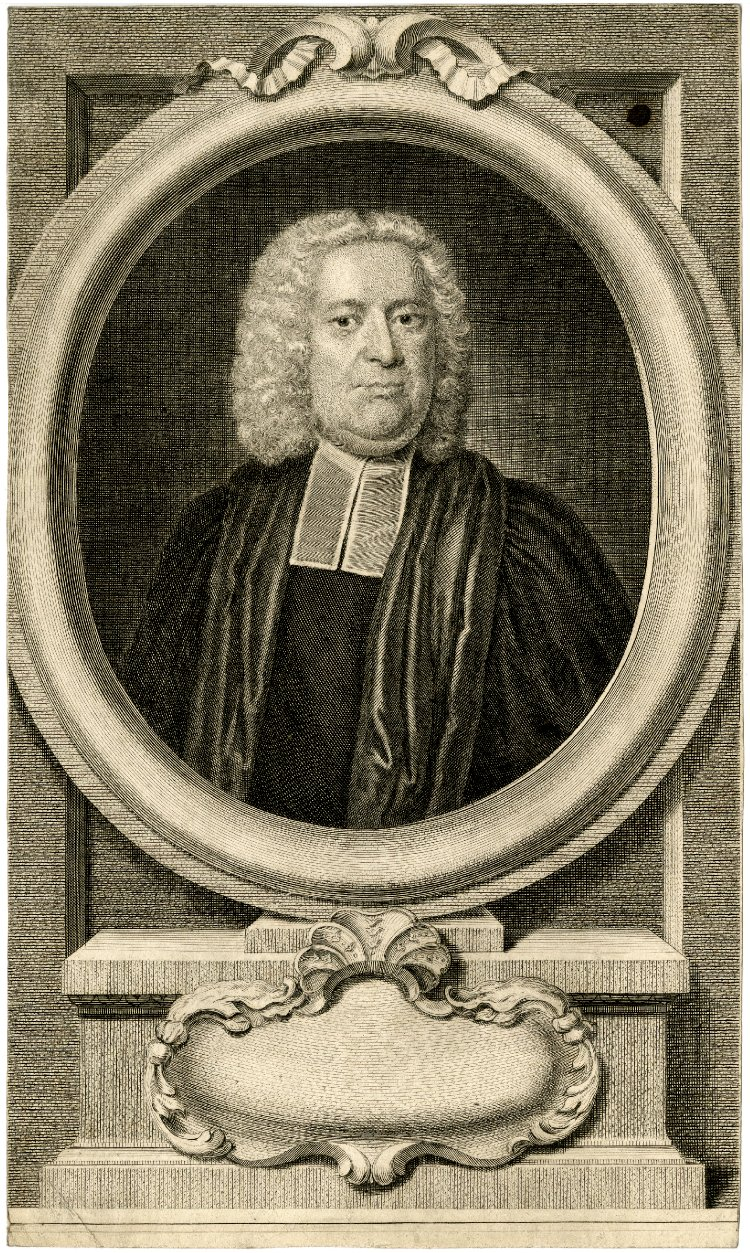
Thomas Stackhouse, 1743 engraving by George Vertue, after John Wollaston.

== Life ==
The son of John Stackhouse (d. 1734), who became rector of Boldon in County Durham, and uncle of John Stackhouse, he was born at Witton-le-Wear where his father was then curate. He was educated at Sedbergh School, and on 3 April 1694 he entered at St. John's College, Cambridge and was B.A. when ordained in 1704.

From 1701 to 1704 Stackhouse was the schoolmaster of Hexham Grammar School, and on 28 December 1704 he was ordained priest in London. He then became curate of Shepperton in Middlesex, and from 1713 was minister of the English church at Amsterdam. In 1731 he was curate of Finchley.

For some time Stackhouse lived in poverty. He was rescued by his appointment in the summer of 1733 to the vicarage of Beenham, Berkshire. In 1737 he had a house in Theobald's Court, London; in 1741 he was living at Chelsea.

Stackhouse died at Beenham on 11 October 1752, and was buried in the parish church, with a large interior monument.

== Works ==
The major work of Stackhouse was his New History of the Holy Bible from the Beginning of the World to the Establishment of Christianity. The genesis of the work was with two booksellers, John Wilford and Thomas Edlin; Stackhouse wrote a pamphlet about them. After a quarrel with a bookseller left him without a publisher, Stackhouse published the text himself in 1733 in two folio volumes. A second edition came out in numbers in 1742–4, and was also published in two folio volumes, with a dedication to his patron, Bishop Edmund Gibson. It was then often reprinted, with additional notes, by other divines. Early editions included the history of the New Testament as part of the text. In some later editions, such as the 1765 London edition owned by George Wythe, the New Testament portion was published separately as "A New History of the New Testament of Our Lord and Saviour Jesus Christ" (Wythepedia, W&M Law library). John Trusler compiled from the work in 1797 A Compendium of Sacred History.

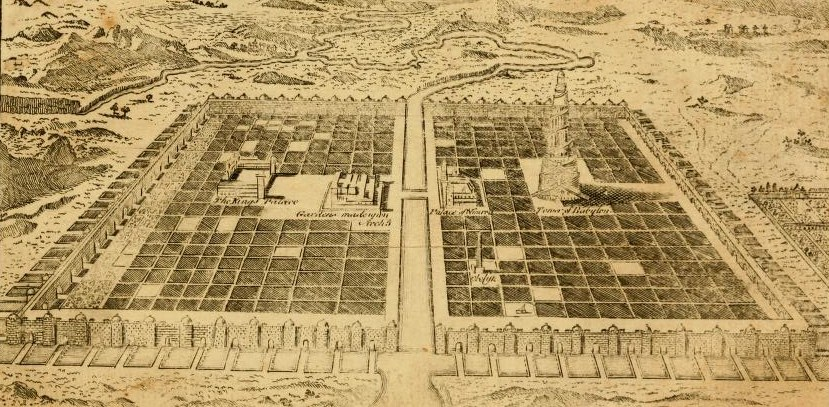
A Plan of the City of Babylon from the 1795 edition of The New History of the Holy Bible.

In 1722, as "A Clergyman of the Church of England", Stackhouse addressed a printed letter to Bishop John Robinson, on the "miseries and great hardships of the inferiour clergy in and about London". It was reissued, and the later editions had his name on the title-page.

Besides sermons, Stackhouse published:

- Memoirs of the Life and Conduct of Bishop Atterbury, by Philalethes, 1723, which he addressed to William Pulteney; a German translation was published at Leipzig in 1724, and it was issued with a new title-page in 1723.
- An abridgment of Gilbert Burnet's History of his own Times, 1724.
- New Translation of Drelincourt's Consolations against Death, 1725.
- A Complete Body of Divinity in Five Parts, from the best Ancient and Modern Writers, 1729; 2nd edit. 1734; reprinted at Dumfries, 3 vols. 1776. The fifth part was issued in 1760 as a separate work, with the title A System of Practical Duties, Moral and Evangelical.
- A fair State of the Controversy between Mr. Woolston and his Adversaries, 1730.
- Defence of the Christian Religion, with the whole state of the Controversy between Mr. Woolston and his Assailants, 1731 and 1733; translated into French by Charles-Pierre Chais at the Hague, and also into German at Hanover in 1750. Liberato Fassoni published at Rome in 1761 a dissertation on the Book of Leporius concerning the Doctrine of the Incarnation, in which the views of Richard Fiddes and Stackhouse were combated.
- Reflections on Languages in General, and on the Advantages, Defects, and Manner of improving the English Tongue in particular, 1731; it was based on a plan of Jean Frain du Tremblay, professor of languages at Angers.
- A New and Practical Exposition of the Apostles' Creed, 1747.
- Varia doctrinæ emolumenta, et varia Studiorum incommoda … versu hexametro exarata, 1752; in this work he recapitulated his own sorrows.
- Life of our Lord and Saviour, with the Lives of the Apostles and Evangelists, 1754 and 1772.

Stackhouse added to the third volume of the works of Archbishop William Dawes a supplement of a course of devotions. He is sometimes credited with the authorship of The Art of Shorthand on a New Plan, by "Thomas Stackhouse, A.M." [1760?].

== Family ==
By his first wife, who died in 1709, Stackhouse had two sons, and by his second wife, Elizabeth Reynell, two sons and one daughter. Thomas Stackhouse, M.A. (1706–1784), the younger son by his first wife, married Hester Nash (d. 1794) in 1767, and died at Lisson Grove, London, in 1784. He wrote:

- Græcæ Grammatices Rudimenta, 1762.
- General View of Ancient History, Chronology, and Geography, 1770; from the preface it appears that he worked as a tutor.
- Chinese Tales, from the French, 1781 and 1817; dedicated to Mrs. Pulteney, whose father had been his benefactor.
