= Archibald Maclaine =

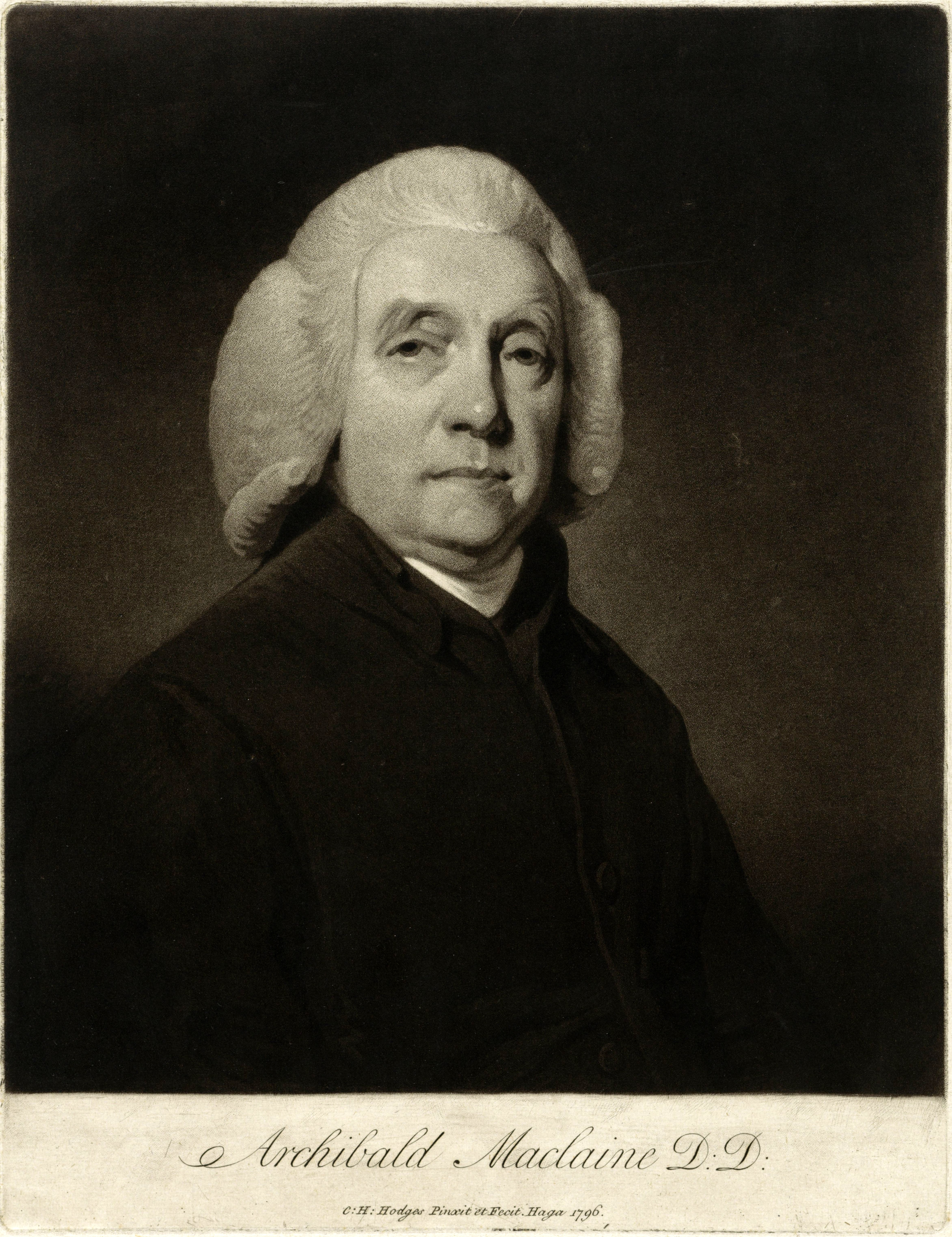
Archibald Maclaine

Archibald Maclaine (1722–1804) was an Irish minister, known as a translator. He spent nearly half a century as pastor at the English church in The Hague.

== Life ==
From a Scots-Irish background, the son of Lauchlin Maclaine and brother of James Maclaine the highwayman, he was born at Monaghan. He was educated at Glasgow University, where he studied under Francis Hutcheson for the Presbyterian ministry. He matriculated there in 1739, took his M.A. degree in 1746, and was awarded a D.D. in 1767.

In 1746 Maclaine became assistant to his maternal uncle, Robert Milling, a pastor of the Church of St John and St Philip at The Hague, and in 1747 was admitted co-pastor. Known in Holland for his learning, he was for a time preceptor to the Prince of Orange. Ill-health, and the disturbances of the fall of the Dutch Republic after the Flanders campaign, led him to resign his charge in 1796.

Maclaine settled at Bath, Somerset where he died on 25 November 1804, and was buried in Bath Abbey. The Rev. John Simpson attended his death-bed. A monument was erected to Maclaine's memory by his friend Henry Hope. The epitaph was by Simpson.

== Works ==
Maclaine published in 1765, in 2 vols., a translation from Latin, with notes, of Johann Lorenz Mosheim's Ecclesiastical History. It was reprinted in 1768 in 5 vols., and in 1782, 1806, 1810, and 1825, in 6 vols. This major work met with the approval of John Wesley, who used it in his abridgement of Mosheim, A Concise Ecclesiastical History (1781).

Maclaine also translated from the French Jean Jacob Vernet's Dialogues on some Important Subjects, 1753. Other works were:

- Series of Letters on occasion of his "View of the Internal Evidence of Christianity," 1777; 2nd edit. 1778, addressed to Soame Jenyns. These contained criticism of Edward Gibbon for his tone. Having stated that Gibbon was free to speak his mind—in contrast to French citizens—he wrote "[...] a sneer may have its place and time: but surely its place cannot be historical narrative, when Christianity the subject of discussion."
- Religion, a Preservative Against Barbarism and Anarchy: A Sermon from Jeremiah, XIII. 16. Preached at the Hague, February 13th, 1793 (1793).
- The Solemn Voice of Public Events Considered in a Discourse from Zephaniah iii. 6,7. (1797).
- Discourses on Various Subjects Delivered in the English Church at the Hague (1799).

With his father-in-law, Maclaine was involved in editing a periodical, the Bibliothèque des sciences et des beaux-arts. He contributed literary articles to The Monthly Review.

== Family ==
Maclaine married in 1758 Esther Wilhelmina Chais (1736–1789), daughter of the Genevan minister Charles-Pierre Chais. They had three sons and a daughter; Charles Anthony, the eldest, was a lawyer, recorder of Brabant, and Henry, the second son, an army officer in Dutch service.
