= Charles-Pierre Chais =

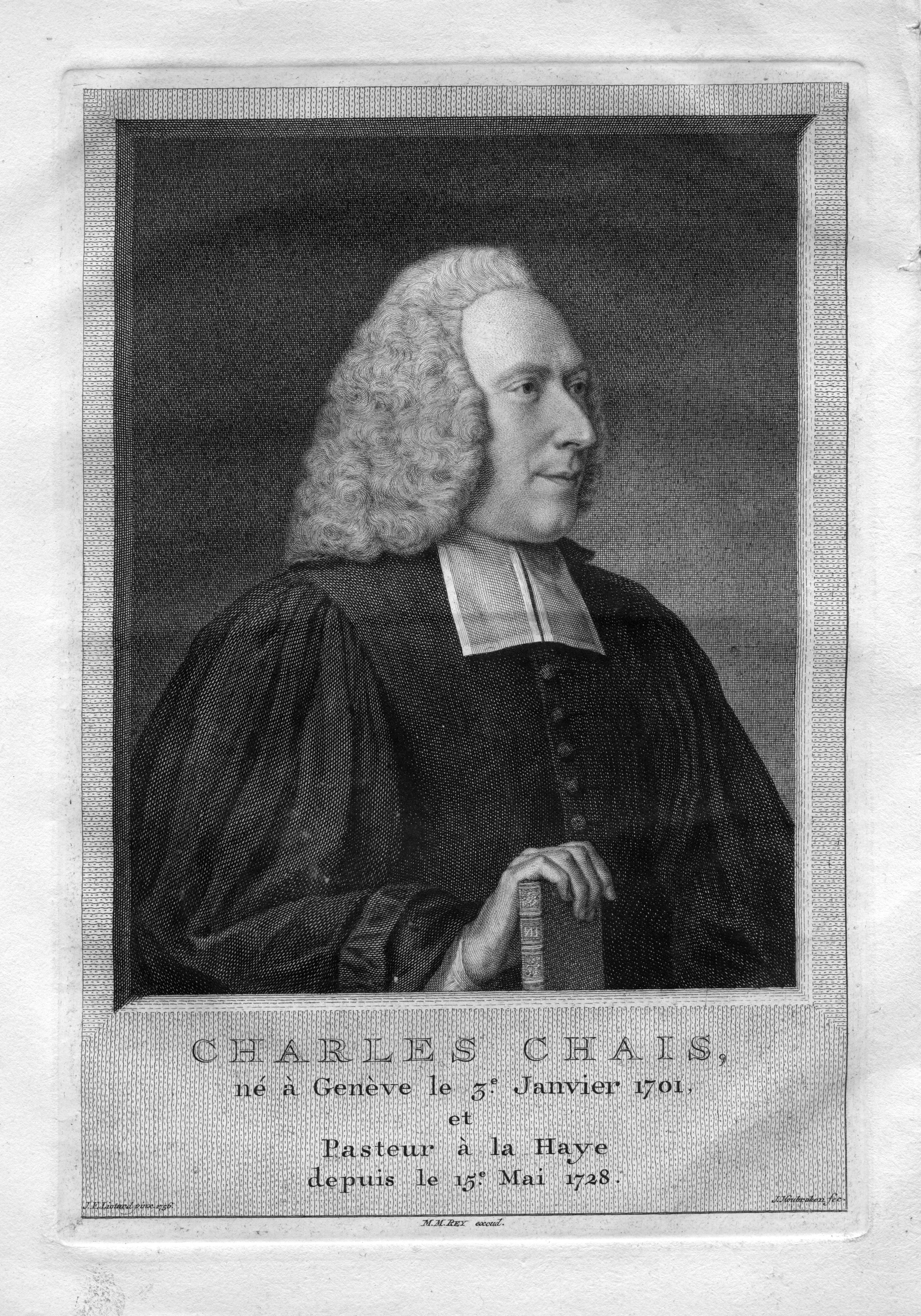
Charles-Pierre Chais

Charles-Pierre Chais (1701–1785) was a Genevan pastor, who spent much of his life in The Hague. He completed a Bible translation in French; however, it derived with commentary from English-language sources.

== Life ==
Chais was born in Geneva in January 1701. He was the son of Jean-François Chais and Alexandrine Maurice. He studied theology in Geneva, and then travelled in France, Germany, and Holland from 1724, when he was ordained, to 1728.

Chais was pastor of the Walloon Church at The Hague from 1728 and for the rest of his life. He also acted as a diplomat. With François Fagel (1659–1746), he saw that Geneva was included in the Treaty of Vienna (1738), at the end of the War of the Polish Succession. Again, in the War of the Austrian Succession, he had the help of Fagel in heading off a Spanish army, that was threatening Geneva in September 1742. His portrait in pastel was taken by Jean-Étienne Liotard.

Chais was a member of the Holland Society of Sciences from 1753. He died at The Hague in 1785.

== Works ==
From 1742, Chais published volumes of a French Bible commentary, La Sainte Bible, ou le vieux et le nouveau testament avec un commentaire littéral composé de notes choisies et tirées de divers auteurs anglois. A seventh volume appeared in 1790, edited by Archibald Maclaine. According to the front matter, the French text is based on the translation of David Martin.

Other works were:

- Le sens littéral de l'écriture sainte, 1751, 3 volumes, translated from the English of Thomas Stackhouse
- Lettres historiques et dogmatiques sur les Jubilés et les indulgences à l'occasion du Jubilé Universel célébré à Rome, 1751
- Théologie de l'Écriture Sainte, ou la Science du Salut, 1752, 2 volumes
- Essai apologétique sur la méthode de communiquer la petite vérole par inoculation, 1754. Chais paid close attention to the Journal Brittanique edited by Matthieu Maty; and noted in it a review of a 1752 sermon by Isaac Maddox in favour of inoculation, given at the London Smallpox and Inoculation Hospital run by Edward Jenner. He wrote this early tract to promote inoculation, and became an authority on the subject.
- Catéchisme historique et dogmatique, 1755, La Haye.

Sermons were published posthumously, starting with Sermons sur divers textes de l'Ecriture sainte (1787).

Chais translated as Les mœurs anglais (1758) John Brown's Estimate of the Manners and Principles of the Times (1757). With others, he edited the periodical Bibliothèque des Sciences et des Beaux Arts that was published at The Hague, from 1754 to 1778.

== Family ==
Chais married in 1734 Wilhelma Antonia Pauw. Their daughter Esther Wilhelmina Chais (1736–1789), married Archibald Maclaine, minister at the English Church in The Hague, in 1758.
