= Jacob Talmon =

Polish-born Israeli historian (1916-1980)

Jacob Leib Talmon
- יעקב טלמון
- Born: 14 June 1916; Rypin, Poland
- Died: 16 June 1980 (aged 64); Jerusalem
- Occupation: Historian
- Awards: Israel Prize (1957)

Jacob Leib Talmon (Hebrew: יעקב טלמון; 14 June 1916 – 16 June 1980) was a Polish-born Israeli historian and Professor of Modern History at the Hebrew University of Jerusalem.

Talmon studied the genealogy of totalitarianism, arguing that political Messianism stemmed from the French Revolution, and stressed the similarities between Jacobinism and Stalinism. He coined the terms "totalitarian democracy" and "Messianic democracy/political Messianism".

== Biography ==
Jacob Leib Talmon was born on 14 June 1916 in Rypin, a town in central Poland, into an Orthodox Jewish family. He left in 1934 to study at the Hebrew University in Jerusalem, then in the British Mandate of Palestine, now Israel. He continued his studies in France but left for London after the Nazi invasion; in 1943 he was awarded a PhD from the London School of Economics. His main works are The Origins of Totalitarian Democracy and Political Messianism: The Romantic Phase. Talmon argued that Rousseau's position may best be understood as "totalitarian democracy", a philosophy in which liberty is realized "only in the pursuit and attainment of an absolute collective purpose." Following the 1967 Six-Day War, Talmon engaged in a debate with Arnold J. Toynbee on the role of Jews and Zionism in history.

Talmon died in Jerusalem on June 16, 1980, two days after his 64th birthday.

== Awards ==
In 1957, Talmon was awarded the Israel Prize for social sciences.

== Major works ==
- The Origins of Totalitarian Democracy. Vol. 1. London: Secker & Warburg. 1952.; vol. 2: 1960
- The Nature of Jewish History-Its Universal Significance, 1957
- Political Messianism – The Romantic Phase, 1960
- The Unique and The Universal, 1965
- Romanticism and Revolt, 1967
- Israel among the Nations, 1968
- The Age of Violence, 1974
- The Myth of Nation and Vision of Revolution – The Origins of Ideological Polarization in the 20th Century, 1981
- The Riddle of the Present and the Cunning of History, 2000 (Hebrew, p.m.)

== See also ==
- Totalitarian democracy
- List of Israel Prize recipients
