= Totalitarian democracy =

Dictatorship based on the mass enthusiasm generated by a perfectionist ideology

Totalitarian democracy is a dictatorship based on the mass enthusiasm generated by a perfectionist ideology. The conflict between the state and the individual should not exist in a totalitarian democracy, and in the event of such a conflict, the state has the moral duty to coerce the individual to obey. This idea that there is one true way for a society to be organized and a government should get there at all costs stands in contrast to liberal democracy, which trusts the process of democracy to, through trial and error, help a society improve without there being only one correct way to self-govern.

== Etymology ==
The term was popularized by Israeli historian Jacob Leib Talmon. It had previously been used by Bertrand de Jouvenel and E. H. Carr, and subsequently by F. William Engdahl and Sheldon S. Wolin.

== Definition ==
In his 1952 book The Origins of Totalitarian Democracy, Talmon argued that the totalitarian and liberal types of democracy emerged from the same premises during the eighteenth century. He regarded the conflict between these two types of democracy as of world-historical importance:

Indeed, from the vantage point of the mid-twentieth century the history of the last hundred and fifty years looks like a systematic preparation for the headlong collision between empirical and liberal democracy on the one hand, and totalitarian Messianic democracy on the other, in which the world crisis of to-day consists.

The political neologism messianic democracy (also political messianism) also derives from Talmon's introduction to this work.

== Differences with liberal democracy ==
Talmon identified the following differences between totalitarian and liberal democracy:

- The totalitarian approach is based on the assumption of a total and exclusive truth in politics. It postulates a preordained, harmonious and perfect scheme of things, to which people are irresistibly driven and at which they are bound to arrive (see historical determinism).
- The liberal approach assumes politics to be a matter of trial and error. It regards political systems as pragmatic contrivances of human ingenuity and spontaneity. The totalitarian approach views politics as an integral part of an all-embracing and coherent philosophy. It defines politics as the art of applying this philosophy to the organisation of society, and the final purpose of politics is only achieved when this philosophy reigns supreme over all fields of life.
- The liberal approach recognises a variety of levels of personal and collective endeavour, which are altogether outside the sphere of politics. The totalitarian approach recognises only one plane of existence, the political. It widens the scope of politics to embrace the whole of human existence. It treats all human thought and action as having social significance, and therefore as falling within the orbit of political action.
- The liberal approach finds the essence of freedom in spontaneity and the absence of coercion. The totalitarian approach believes freedom to be only realised in the pursuit and attainment of an absolute collective purpose.

== Historical development ==
Talmon argue that totalitarian democracy arose in three stages:

1. Intellectual developments in eighteenth-century France spurred by the collapse of feudal and ecclesiastical authority in the early modern era.
2. The development of single-party dictatorship during the Reign of Terror and the use of terror as a political instrument, based on a doctrine of total popular sovereignty.
3. The extension of totalitarian logic to property, leading to Communism.

== Further interpretations ==
Slavoj Žižek, in his 2002 book of essays Welcome to the Desert of the Real, comes to similar conclusions. He argues that the war on terror served as a justification for the suspension of civil liberties in the US, while the promise of democracy and freedom was spread abroad as the justification for invading Iraq and Afghanistan. Since Western democracies are always justifying states of exception, he argues, they are failing as sites of political agency.

== See also ==
- Anti-democratic thought
- Authoritarianism
- Autocracy
- Dictatorship of the proletariat
- Guided democracy
- Illiberal democracy
- Inverted totalitarianism
- Outline of democracy
- People's democratic dictatorship
- Post-democracy
- Soft despotism
- Sovereign democracy
- Tyranny of the majority
