= General will =

Concept in Rousseau's political philosophy

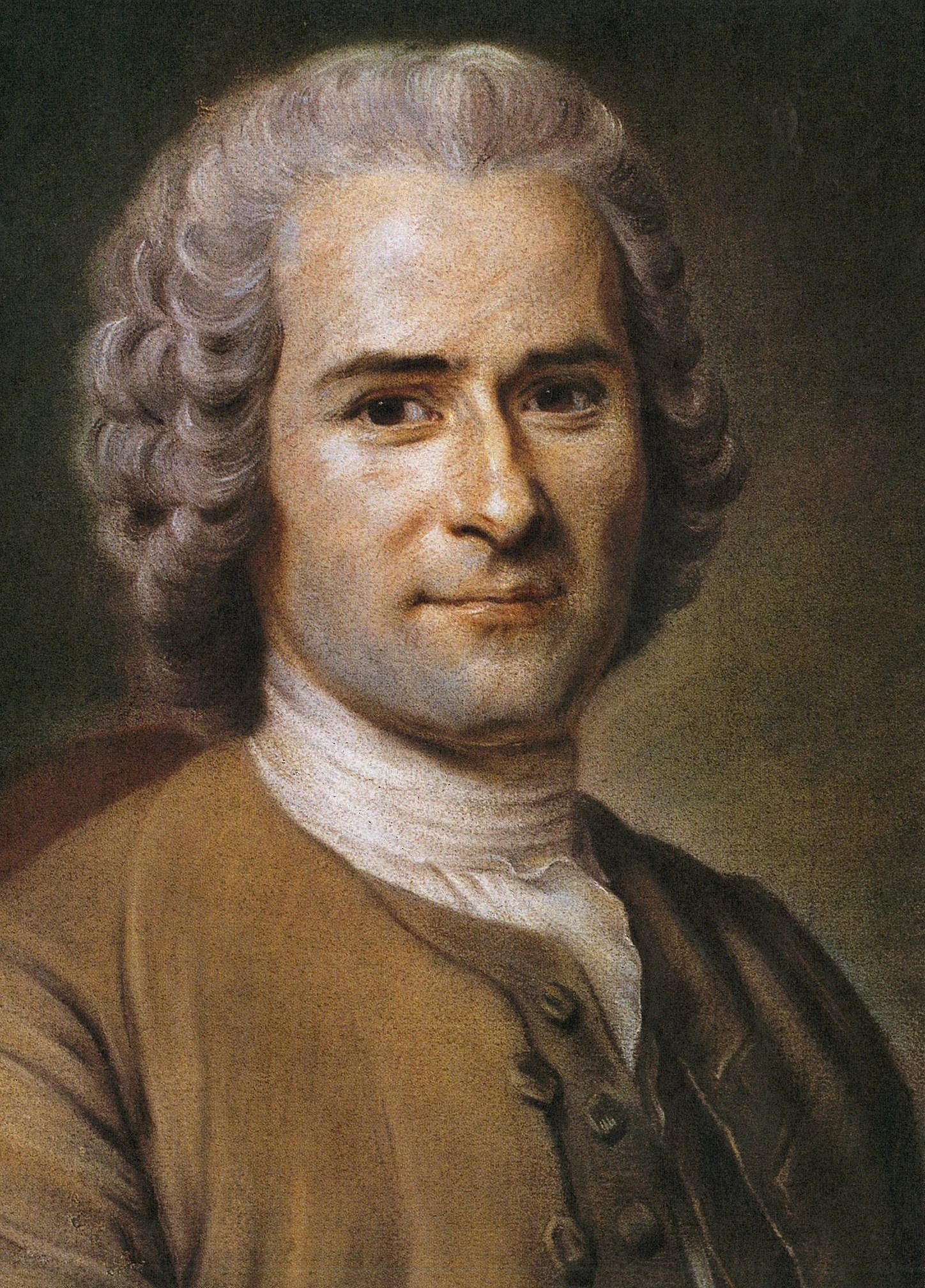
Jean-Jacques Rousseau, populariser of the idea of the general will

In political philosophy, the general will (French: volonté générale) is the will of the people as a whole. The term was made famous by 18th-century Genevan philosopher Jean-Jacques Rousseau.

== Basic ideas ==
The phrase "general will", as Rousseau used it, occurs in Article Six of the Declaration of the Rights of Man and of the Citizen (French: Déclaration des droits de l'Homme et du citoyen), composed in 1789 during the French Revolution:

The law is the expression of the general will. All citizens have the right to contribute personally, or through their representatives, to its formation. It must be the same for all, whether it protects or punishes. All citizens, being equal in its eyes, are equally admissible to all public dignities, positions, and employments, according to their capacities, and without any other distinction than that of their virtues and their talents.

James Swenson writes:

To my knowledge, the only time Rousseau actually uses "expression of the general will" is in a passage of the Discours sur l'économie politique, whose content renders it little susceptible of celebrity. [...] But it is indeed a faithful summary of his doctrine, faithful enough that commentators frequently adopt it without any hesitation. Among Rousseau's definitions of law, the textually closest variant can be found in a passage of the Lettres écrites de la montagne summarizing the argument of Du contrat social, in which law is defined as "a public and solemn declaration of the general will on an object of common interest."

As used by Rousseau, the "general will" is considered by some identical to the rule of law, and to Spinoza's mens una.

The notion of the general will is wholly central to Rousseau's theory of political legitimacy. [...] It is, however, an unfortunately obscure and controversial notion. Some commentators see it as no more than the dictatorship of the proletariat or the tyranny of the urban poor (such as may perhaps be seen in the French Revolution). Such was not Rousseau's meaning. This is clear from the Discourse on Political Economy, where Rousseau emphasizes that the general will exists to protect individuals against the mass, not to require them to be sacrificed to it. He is, of course, sharply aware that men have selfish and sectional interests which will lead them to try to oppress others. It is for this reason that loyalty to the good of all alike must be a supreme (although not exclusive) commitment by everyone, not only if a truly general will is to be heeded but also if it is to be formulated successfully in the first place".

== Debates ==
=== Criticisms ===
Early critics of Rousseau included Benjamin Constant and Georg Wilhelm Friedrich Hegel. Hegel argued that, because it lacked any grounding in an objective ideal of reason, Rousseau's account of the general will inevitably led to the Reign of Terror. Constant also blamed Rousseau for the excesses of the French Revolution and rejected the total subordination of the citizen-subjects to the determinations of the general will.

In 1952 Jacob Talmon characterized Rousseau's "general will" as leading to a totalitarian democracy, because, Talmon argued, the state subjected its citizens to the supposedly infallible will of the majority. Another writer of the period, liberal theorist Karl Popper, also interpreted Rousseau in this way, while Bertrand Russell warned that "the doctrine of general will ... made possible the mystic identification of a leader with its people, which has no need of confirmation by so mundane an apparatus as the ballot box." Other prominent critics include Isaiah Berlin who argued that Rousseau's association of freedom with obedience to the General Will allowed totalitarian leaders to defend oppression in the name of freedom, and made Rousseau "one of the most sinister and formidable enemies of liberty in the whole history of human thought."

=== Defense of Rousseau ===
Some Rousseau scholars, however, such as his biographer and editor Maurice Cranston, and Ralph Leigh, editor of Rousseau's correspondence, do not consider Talmon's 1950s "totalitarian thesis" as sustainable.

Prior to Rousseau, the phrase "general will" referred explicitly to the general (as opposed to the particular) will or volition (as it is sometimes translated) of the Deity. It occurs in the theological writings of Malebranche, who had picked it up from Pascal, and in the writings of Malebranche's pupil, Montesquieu, who contrasted volonté particulière and volonté générale in a secular sense in his most celebrated chapter (Chapter XI) of De L'Esprit des Lois (1748).

== Translations of volonté générale ==
A central aclaration of Rousseau (Contrat Social II, 3) about the difference between volonté de tous (will of all) and volonté génerale (general will) is this:

Si, quand le peuple suffisamment informé délibère, les citoyens nʼavoient aucune communication entrʼeux, du grand nombre de petites différences résulteroit toujours la volonté générale, & la délibération seroit toujours bonne. Mais quand il se fait des brigues, des associations partielles aux dépens de la grande, la volonté de chacune de ces associations devient générale par rapport à ses membres, & particulière par rapport à lʼEtat; on peut dire alors quʼil nʼy a plus autant de votans que dʼhommes, mais seulement autant que dʼassociations. Les différences deviennent moins nombreuses & donnent un résultat moins général.

The following translation is correct, but with one fundamental error:

If, when the people, being furnished with adequate information, held its deliberations, the citizens had no communication with one another, the grand total of the small differences would always give the general will, and the decision would always be good. But when factions arise, and partial associations are formed at the expense of the great association, the will of each of these associations becomes general in relation to its members, while it remains particular in relation to the State: it may then be said that there are no longer as many votes as there are men, but only as many as there are associations. The differences become less numerous and give a less general result.

What has been translated as "decision" – similarly translated in other English and German editions – is by Rousseau "délibère" and "délibération". But a deliberation is not a decision, but a consultation among people in order to reach a majority decision. Therefore, the Roman principle:

Deliberandum est diu quod statuendum est semel.
What is once resolved is to be long deliberated upon before.

== Quotations ==
Diderot on the General Will [emphasis added]:

EVERYTHING you conceive, everything you contemplate, will be good, great, elevated, sublime, if it accords with the general and common interest. There is no quality essential to your species apart from that which you demand from all your fellow men to ensure your happiness and theirs . . . . [D]o not ever lose sight of it, or else you will find that your comprehension of the notions of goodness, justice, humanity and virtue grow dim. Say to yourself often, "I am a man, and I have no other truly inalienable natural rights except those of humanity."

But, you will ask, in what does this general will reside? Where can I consult it? [...] [The answer is:] In the principles of prescribed law of all civilized nations, in the social practices of savage and barbarous peoples; in the tacit agreements obtaining amongst the enemies of mankind; and even in those two emotions—indignation and resentment—which nature has extended as far as animals to compensate for social laws and public retributions. —Denis Diderot, "Droit Naturel" article in the Encyclopédie.

Rousseau on the General Will [emphasis added]:

AS long as several men assembled together consider themselves as a single body, they have only one will which is directed towards their common preservation and general well-being. Then, all the animating forces of the state are vigorous and simple, and its principles are clear and luminous; it has no incompatible or conflicting interests; the common good makes itself so manifestly evident that only common sense is needed to discern it. Peace, unity and equality are the enemies of political sophistication. Upright and simple men are difficult to deceive precisely because of their simplicity; stratagems and clever arguments do not prevail upon them, they are not indeed subtle enough to be dupes. When we see among the happiest people in the world bands of peasants regulating the affairs of state under an oak tree, and always acting wisely, can we help feeling a certain contempt for the refinements of other nations, which employ so much skill and effort to make themselves at once illustrious and wretched?

A state thus governed needs very few laws [...]

However, when the social tie begins to slacken and the state to weaken, when particular interests begin to make themselves felt and sectional societies begin to exert an influence over the greater society, the common interest then becomes corrupted and meets opposition, voting is no longer unanimous; the general will is no longer the will of all; contradictions and disputes arise, and even the best opinion is not allowed to prevail unchallenged."

For this reason the sensible rule for regulating public assemblies is one intended not so much to uphold the general will there, as to ensure that it is always questioned and always responds.

== Other influence ==
Rosseau's conception of the general will influenced Liang Qichao, and in turn, Sun Yat-sen's view of democracy (minquanzhuyi) in the Three Principles of the People. In prioritizing the power of the group over individual freedoms, Sun viewed traditional Chinese society as too individualistic and stated that individual liberty must be broken down so that the Chinese people could pressed together, using the metaphor of adding cement to sand.

== See also ==
- Consensus reality
- Declaration of the Rights of Man and of the Citizen
- Führerprinzip
- Totalitarian democracy
- Median voter theorem
- Natural law
- Natural and legal rights
- Public opinion
- Popular sovereignty
- Rule of law
- Social contract
- Vox populi
- Universalizability
