= The Social Contract =

1762 book by Jean-Jacques Rousseau

The Social Contract; or, Principles of Political Right
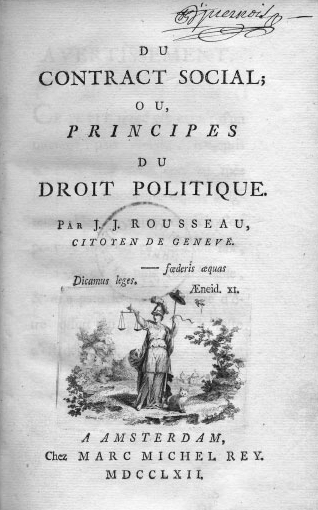
- Title page of the first octavo edition
- Author: Jean-Jacques Rousseau
- Original title: Du contrat social; ou, Principes du droit politique
- Language: French
- Publication date: 1762
- Publication place: France (edited in Amsterdam)
- Original text: Du contrat social; ou, Principes du droit politique at French Wikisource
- Translation: The Social Contract; or, Principles of Political Right at Wikisource

The Social Contract, originally published as On the Social Contract; or, Principles of Political Right (French: Du contrat social; ou, Principes du droit politique), is a 1762 French-language book by the Genevan philosopher Jean-Jacques Rousseau. The book theorizes about how to establish legitimate authority in a political community, that is, one compatible with individual freedom, in the face of the problems of commercial society, which Rousseau had already identified in his Discourse on Inequality (1755).

The Social Contract helped inspire political reforms or revolutions in Europe, especially in France. The Social Contract argued against the idea that monarchs were divinely empowered to legislate. Rousseau asserts that only the general will of the people has the right to legislate, for only under the general will can the people be said to obey only themselves and hence be free. Although Rousseau's notion of the general will is subject to much interpretive controversy, it seems to involve a legislature consisting of all adult members of the political community who are restricted to legislating general laws for the common good.

== Overview ==
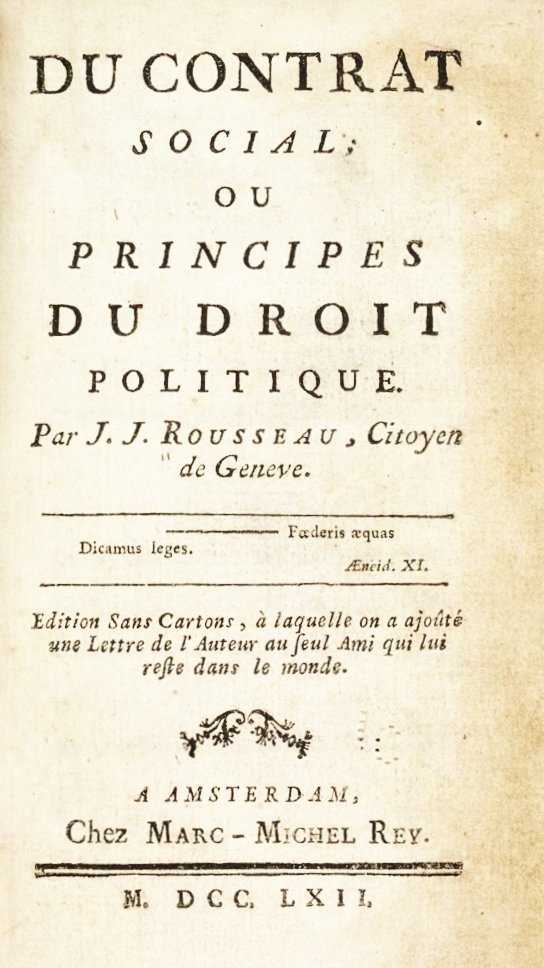
Title page of a pirated edition of the Social Contract, probably printed in Germany

The epigraph of the work is "foederis aequas / dicamus leges" ("Let us set equal terms for the truce") (Virgil, Aeneid XI.321–22). The stated aim of The Social Contract is to determine whether there can be a legitimate political authority, since people's interactions he saw at his time seemed to put them in a state far worse than the good one they were at in the state of nature, even though living in isolation. He concludes book one, chapter three with, "Let us then admit that force does not create right, and that we are obliged to obey only legitimate powers", which is to say, the ability to coerce is not a legitimate power―might does not make right. The people have no duty to submit to it. A state has no right to enslave a conquered people.

Rousseau argues that legitimate authority must be compatible with individual freedom. Such authority can only be compatible with individual freedom if it is consented to, and hence there must be a social contract. However, Rousseau's conception of this social contract was different to that of thinkers before him, such as Grotius, Hobbes, and Pufendorf. For Rousseau, since one's right to freedom is inalienable, the people cannot obligate themselves to obey someone other than themselves. Transferring rights to an authority involved renunciation of freedom and transformed the natural equality of men into subjection. Hence, the only legitimate social contract is one that establishes the people themselves as the rulers. Rousseau refers to the united will of the people as the general will. The general will, to be truly general, must only legislate laws with general form, i.e., laws that apply equally to all. For Rousseau, collective self-rule would increase freedom if the people to whom laws applied were also the ones prescribing them. Rousseau, who objected to extreme wealth inequality, also argued that equality is essential for the attainment of liberty, and concluded that legislation ought to preserve equality.

Rousseau argues that the sovereign power must be separate from the government, which in Rousseau's terminology refers to the executive power. The division of sovereign from government is necessary because the sovereign cannot deal with particular matters like applications of the law. Doing so would undermine its generality, and therefore damage its legitimacy. Thus, the government must remain a separate institution from the sovereign body. When the government exceeds the boundaries set in place by the people, it is the mission of the people to abolish such government and begin anew.

Rousseau claims that the size of the territory to be governed often decides the nature of the government. Since a government is only as strong as the people, and this strength is absolute, the larger the territory, the more strength the government must be able to exert over the populace (cf. also Turner's frontier thesis for the case of America). In his view, a monarchical government is able to wield the most power over the people since it has to devote less power to itself, while a democracy the least. In general, the larger the bureaucracy, the more power required for government discipline. Normally, this relationship requires the state to be an aristocracy or monarchy. Rousseau's use of the terms "democracy", "aristocracy", and "monarchy" differ from their conventional meanings and exclusively refer to the nature of the executive. A democracy is defined as a state where executive power is held by half or more of the population, an aristocracy where this power belongs to any number of people between two individuals and half of the population, and a monarchy as one in which the executive is one individual, as in a presidential system. The means in which an individual or individuals come into executive power are irrelevant in this terminology; monarchy and aristocracy need not entail hereditary political power. Regardless of which of these three categories describe a state's executive, the state is only legitimate if legislative power is held by all the people.

When Rousseau uses the word democracy, he refers to an executive composed of all or most of the people (Bk. 3, Ch. 3, Para. 2) rather than to a representative democracy. Rousseau argues that it is the people themselves, not their representatives, who have supreme power, and that everyone taking part in legislation is a check against abuse of power. In light of the relation between population size and governmental structure, Rousseau argues that like his native Geneva, small city-states are the form of the nation in which freedom can best flourish. For states of this size, an elected aristocracy is preferable, and in very large states a benevolent monarch; but even monarchical rule, to be legitimate, must be subordinate to the sovereign rule of law.

== Reception ==
Upon publication, the distribution of The Social Contract in France was prohibited, and Rousseau fled the country to avoid imprisonment. However, it was primarily Rousseau's chapter on civil religion, rather than his ideas on liberty and sovereignty, that caused the controversy.

In America, Noah Webster borrowed heavily from The Social Contract to write Sketches of American Policy (1785), one of the earliest widely-published arguments for a strong central government in America.

Immanuel Kant, one of the most influential moral philosophers in Western philosophy, acknowledged his debt to Rousseau's work in political philosophy, of which The Social Contract is perhaps the closest to a complete statement. Kant wrote, "I myself am a researcher by inclination. I feel the entire thirst for cognition and the eager restlessness to proceed further in it, as well as the satisfaction at every acquisition. There was a time when I believed this alone could constitute the honour of humankind, and I despised the rabble who knows nothing. Rousseau has set me right. This blinding prejudice vanishes, I learn to honour human beings, and I would feel by far less useful than the common labourer if I did not believe that this consideration could impart a value to all others in order to establish the rights of humanity." (Refl. 20:44)

The French philosopher Voltaire used his publications to criticise and mock Rousseau, but also to defend free expression. In his Idées républicaines (1765), he reacted to the news that The Social Contract had been burned in Geneva, saying "The operation of burning it was perhaps as odious as that of writing it. […] To burn a book of argument is to say: 'We do not have enough wit to reply to it.'" The work was also banned in Paris and was forbidden by the Church being listed on the Index Librorum Prohibitorum. (Note: Beacon for Freedom of Expression search for Rousseau)

The work received a refutation called The Confusion of the Social Contract by Jean-Jacques Rousseau by the Jesuit Alfonso Muzzarelli in Italy in 1794.

The influence of Rousseau on Maximilien Robespierre from his diary during the Estates General of 1789:

Divine man! It was you who taught me to know myself. When I was young you brought me to appreciate the true dignity of my nature and to reflect on the great principles which govern the social order . . . . I saw you in your last days and for me the recollection of the time will always be a source of proud joy. I contemplated your august features and saw there the imprint of those dark griefs which the injustice of man inflicted on you.

Thomas Carlyle assessed its impact:

and now has not Jean Jacques promulgated his new Evangel of a Contrat Social; explaining the whole mystery of Government, and how it is contracted and bargained for,—to universal satisfaction? Theories of Government! Such have been, and will be; in ages of decadence. Acknowledge them in their degree; as processes of Nature, who does nothing in vain; as steps in her great process. Meanwhile, what theory is so certain as this, That all theories, were they never so earnest, painfully elaborated, are, and, by the very conditions of them, must be incomplete, questionable, and even false? Thou shalt know that this Universe is, what it professes to be, an infinite one. Attempt not to swallow it, for thy logical digestion; be thankful, if skilfully planting down this and the other fixed pillar in the chaos, thou prevent its swallowing thee. That a new young generation has exchanged the Sceptic Creed, What shall I believe? for passionate Faith in this Gospel according to Jean Jacques is a further step in the business; and betokens much.

He advised: "In such prophesied Lubberland, of Happiness, Benevolence, and Vice cured of its deformity, trust not, my friends! . . . Is not Sentimentalism twin-sister to Cant, if not one and the same with it? Is not Cant the materia prima of the Devil; from which all falsehoods, imbecilities, abominations body themselves; from which no true thing can come? For Cant is itself properly a double-distilled Lie; the second-power of a Lie."

== See also ==
- George Mason Memorial, Washington, D.C., includes Du Contract Social as an element of the statue of a seated Mason.
- Totalitarian democracy
